Brian Douglas Wilson (born June 20, 1942) is an American musician, singer, songwriter, and record producer who co-founded the Beach Boys. Often called a genius for his novel approaches to pop composition, extraordinary musical aptitude, and mastery of recording techniques, he is widely acknowledged as one of the most innovative and significant songwriters of the 20th century. His best-known work is distinguished for its high production values, complex harmonies and orchestrations, layered vocals, and introspective or ingenuous themes. Wilson is also known for his formerly high-ranged singing and for his lifelong struggles with mental illness.

Raised in Hawthorne, California, Wilson's formative influences included George Gershwin, the Four Freshmen, Phil Spector, and Burt Bacharach. In 1961, he began his professional career as a member of the Beach Boys, serving as the band's songwriter, producer, co-lead vocalist, bassist, keyboardist, and de facto leader. After signing with Capitol Records in 1962, he became the first pop artist credited for writing, arranging, producing, and performing his own material. He also produced other acts, most notably the Honeys and American Spring. By the mid-1960s he had written or co-written more than two dozen U.S. Top 40 hits, including the number-ones "Surf City" (1963), "I Get Around" (1964), "Help Me, Rhonda" (1965), and "Good Vibrations" (1966). He is considered among the first music producer auteurs and the first rock producers to apply the studio as an instrument.

In 1964, Wilson had a nervous breakdown and resigned from regular concert touring, which led to more refined work, such as the Beach Boys' Pet Sounds and his first credited solo release, "Caroline, No" (both 1966), as well as the unfinished album Smile. As he declined professionally and psychologically in the late 1960s, his contributions to the band diminished, and legends grew around his lifestyle of seclusion, overeating, and drug abuse. His first comeback, divisive among fans, yielded the would-be solo effort The Beach Boys Love You (1977). In the 1980s he formed a controversial creative and business partnership with his psychologist, Eugene Landy, and relaunched his solo career with the album Brian Wilson (1988). Wilson disassociated from Landy in 1991 and went on to tour regularly as a solo artist from 1999 to 2022.

Heralding popular music's recognition as an art form, Wilson's accomplishments as a producer helped initiate an era of unprecedented creative autonomy for label-signed acts. The youth zeitgeist of the 1960s is commonly associated with his early songs, and he is regarded as an important figure to many music genres and movements, including the California sound, art pop, psychedelia, chamber pop, progressive music, punk, outsider, and sunshine pop. Since the 1980s, his influence has extended to styles such as post-punk, indie rock, emo, dream pop, Shibuya-kei, and chillwave. Wilson's accolades include numerous industry awards, inductions into multiple music halls of fame, and entries on several "greatest of all time" critics' rankings. His life was dramatized in the 2014 biopic Love & Mercy.

Life and career

1942–1961: Background and musical training

Childhood

Brian Douglas Wilson was born on June 20, 1942, at Centinela Hospital Medical Center in Inglewood, California, the first child of Audree Neva (née Korthof) and Murry Wilson, a machinist and later a part-time songwriter. He has Dutch, Scottish, English, German, Irish, and Swedish ancestry. Brian's two younger brothers Dennis and Carl were born in 1944 and 1946, respectively. Shortly after Dennis' birth, the family moved from Inglewood to 3701 West 119th Street in nearby Hawthorne, California. Like his brothers, Brian suffered abuse from his father that was mostly psychological and sometimes physical. He characterized his father as "violent" and "cruel"; however, many of the stories which later circulated about his father's treatment were "dirty lies", according to Wilson, and that "even the things that are true" had been misreported.

From an early age, Wilson demonstrated an extraordinary skill for learning by ear. Speaking of his unusual musical abilities prior to his first birthday, his father said that, as a baby, he could repeat the melody from "When the Caissons Go Rolling Along" after only a few verses had been sung by the father. The Wilsons' father encouraged his children in the music field in numerous ways. As a child, Wilson was given six weeks of lessons on a "toy accordion" and, at seven and eight, sang solos in church with a choir behind him. There, his choir director discovered that Wilson had perfect pitch. After the Wilson family purchased a piano for their home, Brian abandoned his accordion and devoted hours to learning his favorite songs on piano. Later, he learned to write manuscript music from a friend of his father's.

Wilson sang with various students at school functions and with his family and friends at home, teaching his two brothers harmony parts that all three would then practice. He also played piano obsessively after school, deconstructing the harmonies of the Four Freshmen by listening to short segments of their songs on a phonograph, then working to recreate the blended sounds note by note on the keyboard. Moreover, he owned an educational record called The Instruments of the Orchestra and frequently listened to his favorite radio station at the time, KFWB. He was introduced to R&B by Carl and taught to play boogie woogie piano by their uncle Charlie. According to Brian, he and Carl often "stayed up all night" listening to Johnny Otis' KFOX radio show to discuss its R&B songs and add them "to our musical vocabulary". Carl said that, by the time Brian was ten, "he could play great boogie-woogie piano!"

One of Brian's first songwriting exercises, penned on a sheet of paper when he was nine, was a rewriting of the lyrics to Stephen Foster's "Oh! Susannah". In his 1991 memoir, he recalls writing his first song for a 4th grade school project concerning Paul Bunyan. In a 2005 interview, he said that he began composing original music in 1955, when he was 12.

Carl said, "There were many years of [Brian's] life where he did nothing but play the piano. Months at a time. Days on end. Four Freshmen records. Just all music." Dennis remembered, "Brian was the freak. He used to stay in his room all day listening to records rather than play baseball." Their mother recalled that Brian "constantly" listened to the radio in his room during his junior high school years.  "Murry once [said] to me, 'Do you think we should worry about him?' I said, 'No. He's just loving the music.'"

High school and college
In high school, Wilson was quarterback on his local football team at Hawthorne High. He also played baseball and was a cross-country runner in his senior year. Before his success in music, Wilson's only paid employment was a part-time job sweeping at a jewelry store for four months when he was 15. On weekends, he was also a cleaner for his father's machining company, ABLE. Around this time, Wilson auditioned to be the singer of the record to mark the launch of the Original Sound Record Company, "Chapel of Love" (unrelated to the 1964 song), but he was rejected for being too young. For his 16th birthday, he received a portable two-track Wollensak tape recorder, allowing him to experiment with recording songs, group vocals, and rudimentary production techniques. Biographer Peter Ames Carlin writes that the tapes suggest that "Brian liked nothing more than to gather his friends around the piano [...] Most often he'd harmonize with [...] friends from his senior class."

Written for his Senior Problems course in October 1959, Wilson submitted an essay, "My Philosophy", in which he stated that his ambitions were to "make a name for myself [...] in music." One of Wilson's earliest public performances was at a fall arts program at his high school. He enlisted his cousin and frequent singing partner Mike Love and, to entice Carl into the group, named the newly formed membership "Carl and the Passions." The performance featured tunes by Dion and the Belmonts and the Four Freshmen ("It's a Blue World"), the latter of which proved difficult for the ensemble. The event was notable for the impression which it made on another musician and classmate of Wilson's in the audience, Al Jardine.

Fred Morgan, Wilson's high school music teacher, remembered that Wilson, at 17, had demonstrated an above-average understanding of Bach and Beethoven. Nonetheless, he gave Wilson a final grade of C for his Piano and Harmony course due to incomplete assignments. For his final project, instead of composing a 120-measure piano sonata, Wilson submitted a 32-measure piece. Morgan gave the work an F. Reflecting on his last year of high school, Brian said that he was "very happy. I wouldn't say I was popular in school, but I was associated with popular people."

Wilson enrolled as a psychology major at El Camino Junior College in Los Angeles, in September 1960, while simultaneously continuing his musical studies at the community college as well. He was disappointed to find that his music teachers strongly disapproved of pop music, and he quit college after a year and half. By Wilson's account, he wrote his first all-original melody, loosely based on a Dion and the Belmonts version of "When You Wish Upon a Star", in 1961. The song was eventually known as "Surfer Girl". However, Wilson's closest high school friends disputed this, recalling that Wilson had written numerous songs prior to "Surfer Girl".

Formation of the Beach Boys
Wilson, brothers Carl and Dennis, cousin Mike Love, and their friend Al Jardine first appeared as a music group in the autumn of 1961, initially under the name the Pendletones. After being prodded by Dennis to write a song about the local water-sports craze, Wilson and Mike Love together created what became the first single for the band, "Surfin'". Around this time, the group rented an amplifier, a microphone, and a stand-up bass for Jardine to play. After the boys rehearsed for several weeks in the Wilsons' music room, his parents returned home from a brief trip to Mexico. Eventually impressed, Murry Wilson proclaimed himself the group's manager and the band embarked on serious rehearsals for a proper studio session.

Recorded by Hite and Dorinda Morgan and released on the small Candix Records label, "Surfin'" became a top local hit in Los Angeles and reached number 75 on the national Billboard sales charts. Dennis later described the first time that his older brother heard their song on the radio, as the three Wilson brothers and David Marks drove in Wilson's 1957 Ford in the rain: "Nothing will ever top the expression on Brian's face, ever ... that was the all-time moment." However, the Pendletones were no more, as Candix Records had changed their name to the Beach Boys. Wilson and his bandmates, following a set by Ike & Tina Turner, performed their first major live show at the Ritchie Valens Memorial Dance on New Year's Eve, 1961. Three days previously, Wilson's father had bought him an electric bass and amplifier. Wilson had learned to play the instrument in that short period of time, with Jardine moving to rhythm guitar.

When Candix Records ran into money problems and sold the Beach Boys' master recordings to another label, Wilson's father terminated the contract. As "Surfin'" faded from the charts, Wilson, who had forged a songwriting partnership with local musician Gary Usher, created several new songs, including a car song, "409", that Usher helped them write. Wilson and the Beach Boys cut new tracks at Western Recorders in Hollywood, including "Surfin' Safari" and "409". These songs convinced Capitol Records to release the demos as a single; they became a double-sided national hit.

1962–1966: Peak years

Early productions and freelance work
As a member of the Beach Boys, Wilson was signed by Capitol Records' Nick Venet to a seven-year contract in 1962. Recording sessions for the band's first album, Surfin' Safari, took place in Capitol's basement studios in the famous tower building in August, but early on Wilson lobbied for a different place to cut Beach Boys tracks. The large rooms were built to record the big orchestras and ensembles of the 1950s, not small rock groups. At Wilson's insistence, Capitol agreed to let the Beach Boys pay for their own outside recording sessions, to which Capitol would own all the rights. Additionally, during the taping of their first LP, Wilson fought for, and won, the right to helm the production – though this fact was not acknowledged with a production credit in the album liner notes.

Wilson remarked, "I've always felt I was a behind-the-scenes man, rather than an entertainer." He had been a massive fan of Phil Spector – who had risen to fame with the Teddy Bears – and aspired to model his burgeoning career after the record producer. With Gary Usher, Wilson wrote numerous songs patterned after the Teddy Bears, and they wrote and produced some records for local talent, albeit with no commercial success. Brian gradually dissolved his partnership with Usher due to interference from Murry. Brian's first record that he produced outside of the Beach Boys, albeit uncredited, was Rachel and the Revolvers' "The Revo-Lution", written with Usher and issued by Dot Records in September.

By mid-1962, Brian was writing songs with DJ Roger Christian, whom he had met through either Murry or Usher, and guitarist Bob Norberg, who became Wilson's roommate. David Marks said, "He was obsessed with it. Brian was writing song with people off the street in front of his house, disc jockeys, anyone. He had so much stuff flowing through him at once he could hardly handle it." In October, Safari Records, a label created by Murry, released the single "The Surfer Moon" by Bob & Sheri. It was the first record that bore the label "Produced by Brian Wilson". The only other record the label issued was Bob & Sheri's "Humpty Dumpty". Both songs were written by Wilson.

From January to March 1963, Wilson produced the Beach Boys' second album, Surfin' U.S.A.. To focus his efforts on writing and recording, he limited his public appearances with the group to television gigs and local shows. Otherwise, David Marks acted as Wilson's substitute on vocals. In March, Capitol released the Beach Boys' first top-ten single, "Surfin' U.S.A.", which began their long run of highly successful recording efforts at Western. The Surfin' U.S.A. album was also a big hit in the U.S., reaching number two on the national sales charts by July. The Beach Boys had become a top-rank recording and touring band.

Against Venet's wishes, Wilson worked with non-Capitol acts. Shortly after meeting Liberty Records' Jan and Dean (likely in August 1962), Wilson offered them a new song he had written, "Surf City", which the duo soon recorded. On July 20, 1963, "Surf City", which Wilson co-wrote with Jan Berry, was his first composition to reach the top of the US charts. The resulting success pleased Wilson, but angered both Murry and Capitol Records. Murry went so far as to order his oldest son to sever any future collaborations with Jan and Dean, although they continued to appear on each other's records. Wilson's hits with Jan and Dean effectively revitalized the music duo's then-faltering career.

Around the same time, Wilson began producing a girl group, the Honeys, consisting of sisters Marilyn and Diane Rovell and their cousin Ginger Blake, who were local high school students he had met at a Beach Boys concert during the previous August. Wilson pitched the Honeys to Capitol, envisioning them as a female counterpart to the Beach Boys. The company released several Honeys recordings as singles, although they sold poorly. In the meantime, Wilson became closely acquainted with the Rovell family and made their home his primary residence for most of 1963 and 1964.

Wilson was for the first time officially credited as the Beach Boys' producer on the album Surfer Girl, recorded in June and July 1963 and released that September. This LP reached number seven on the national charts, with similarly successful singles. He also produced a set of largely car-oriented tunes for the Beach Boys' fourth album, Little Deuce Coupe, which was released in October 1963, only three weeks after the Surfer Girl LP. Still resistant to touring, Wilson was replaced onstage for many of the band's live performances in mid-1963 by Al Jardine, who had briefly quit the band to focus on school. Wilson was forced to rejoin the touring line-up upon Marks' departure in late 1963.

Towards the end of 1963, Wilson formed a record production company, Brian Wilson Productions, with an office on Sunset Boulevard, and a music publishing company, Ocean Music, for songs he wrote for other artists.  Excepting his work with the Beach Boys, for the whole of 1963, Wilson had written, arranged, produced, or performed on at least 42 songs with the Honeys, Jan and Dean, the Survivors, Sharon Marie, the Timers, the Castells ("I Do"), Bob Norberg, Vickie Kocher, Gary Usher, Christian, Paul Petersen ("She Rides with Me"), and Larry Denton ("Endless Sleep").

International success and first nervous breakdown

Throughout 1964, Wilson engaged in worldwide concert tours with the Beach Boys while continuing to write and produce for the group, whose studio output for this year included the albums Shut Down Volume 2 (March), All Summer Long (June), and The Beach Boys' Christmas Album (November). Following a particularly stressful Australasian tour in early 1964, it was agreed by the group to dismiss Murry from his managerial duties. Murry still had a subsequent influence over the band's activities and kept a direct correspondence with Brian, giving him thoughts about the group's decisions; Wilson also periodically sought music opinions from his father.

In February, Beatlemania swept the U.S., a development that deeply disturbed Wilson. In a 1966 interview, he commented, "The Beatles invasion shook me up a lot. They eclipsed a lot of what we'd worked for. [...] The Beach Boys' supremacy as the number one vocal group in America was being challenged. So we stepped on the gas a little bit." Author James Perone identifies the Beach Boys' May single "I Get Around", their first U.S. number one hit, as representing both a successful response by Wilson to the British Invasion, and the beginning of an unofficial rivalry between him and the Beatles, principally Paul McCartney. The B-side, "Don't Worry Baby", was cited by Wilson in a 1970 interview as "Probably the best record we've done".

The increasing pressures of Wilson's career and personal life pushed him to a psychological breaking point. He had ceased writing surfing-themed material after "Don't Back Down" in April, and during the group's first major European tour, in late 1964, replied angrily to a journalist when asked how he felt about originating the surfing sound. Wilson resented being identified with surf and car songs, explaining that he had only intended to "produce a sound that teens dig, and that can be applied to any theme. [...] We're just gonna stay on the life of a social teenager." He later described himself as a "Mr Everything" that had been so "run down mentally and emotionally [...] to the point where I had no peace of mind and no chance to actually sit down and think or even rest." Adding to his concerns was the group's "business operations" and the quality of their records, which he believed suffered from this arrangement. On December 7, in an effort to bring himself more emotional stability, Wilson impulsively married Marilyn Rovell.

On December 23, Wilson was to accompany his bandmates on a two-week US tour, but while on a flight from Los Angeles to Houston, began sobbing uncontrollably over his marriage. Al Jardine, who had sat next to Wilson on the plane, later said, "None of us had ever witnessed something like that." Wilson played the show in Houston later that day, but was replaced by session musician Glen Campbell for the rest of the tour dates. At the time, Wilson described it as "the first of a series of three breakdowns I had." When the group resumed recording their next album in January 1965, Wilson declared to his bandmates that he would be withdrawing from future tours. He later told a journalist that his decision had been a byproduct of his "fucked up" jealousy toward Spector and the Beatles.

Growing drug use, LSD, and religious epiphany
In 1965, Wilson immediately showcased great advances in his musical development with the albums The Beach Boys Today! (March) and Summer Days (And Summer Nights!!) (June). Campbell remained on tour with the band until he was no longer able to, in February. As a thanks, Wilson produced a single for Campbell in March, "Guess I'm Dumb", after which the band recruited Columbia Records staff producer Bruce Johnston as Wilson's substitute on tour. In February, March, July, and October, Wilson rejoined the live group for one-off occasions.

With his bandmates often away on tour, Wilson distanced himself socially from the other Beach Boys. Since the autumn of 1964, he had moved from the Rovells' home to a one-bedroom apartment at 7235 Hollywood Boulevard, and given his newfound independence, had begun forming a new social circle for himself through the industry connections he had accumulated. Biographer Steven Gaines writes, "Brian had total freedom from family restraints for the first time. [...] he was finally able to make a new set of friends without parental interference." By Gary Usher's account, Wilson had had few close friends and was "like a piece of clay waiting to be molded". By the end of the year, Wilson was one of the most successful, influential, and sought-after young musicians in Los Angeles. However, a wider public recognition of Wilson's talents eluded him until 1966.

Wilson stated that "a lot of [his] friends", who were drug users, had "turned [him] on" to drugs while he had been touring with the group. Beforehand, according to Mike Love, Wilson had been known to be strictly opposed to drugs. Wilson's closest friend in this period was Loren Schwartz, a talent agent that he had met at a Hollywood studio. Through Schwartz, Wilson was exposed to a wealth of literature and mystical topics – largely of philosophy and world religions – that he formed a deep fascination with. Schwartz also introduced marijuana and hashish to Wilson, whose habitual use of the drug caused a rift in his marriage to Marilyn, further strained by his frequent visitations to Schwartz's apartment. Beginning with "Please Let Me Wonder" (1965), Wilson wrote songs while under the influence of marijuana. As his 2016 memoir suggested, "smoking a little bit of pot [...] changed the way I heard arrangements." His drug use was initially kept hidden from the rest of his family and group.

Early in 1965, a few weeks after Wilson and his wife moved into a new apartment on West Hollywood's Gardner Street, Wilson took the psychedelic drug LSD (or "acid") for the first time, under Schwartz' supervision. Schwartz recalled that Wilson's dosage was 125 micrograms of "pure Owsley" and that his first experience included "the full-on ego death". Marilyn recalled that Wilson returned home the next day and recounted his experience, telling her repeatedly that his "mind was blown" and that he had seen God. In Wilson's words, "I took LSD and it just tore my head off. [...] You just come to grips with what you are, what you can do [and] can't do, and learn to face it."

During his first acid trip, Wilson went to a piano and devised the riff for the band's next single, "California Girls". He later described the instrumental tracking for the song, held on April 6, as "my favorite session", and the opening orchestral section as "the greatest piece of music that I've ever written." For the remainder of the year, he experienced considerable paranoia. Wilson's 2016 memoir states that he refrained from dropping LSD for a second time until he was twenty-three, in 1966 or 1967. Marilyn believed that her husband likely took dozens of LSD trips in the subsequent years, although she had been only aware of the two trips at the time. Conversely, Brian's second wife Melinda Ledbetter claimed in 2004 that Brian took only three LSD trips in his lifetime.

Following unsuccessful attempts to dissuade him from his constant fraternizing with Schwartz, Marilyn separated from Brian for at least a month. She later said, "He was not the same Brian that he was before the drugs. [...] These people were very hurtful, and I tried to get that through to Brian." In mid-1965, at the suggestion of Four Freshmen manager Bill Wagner, Brian consulted with a UCLA psychiatrist on the adverse effects of LSD. The psychiatrist later told Wagner, "I don't know if he is savable. He gives me the impression he's been on it for a while, and he's entirely enamored of it." Speaking in 1966, Wilson said that he had developed an interest in "pills" for the purpose of self-discovery, not recreation, and believed that the usage of psychedelics "won't hurt you".

Pet Sounds, "genius" campaign, and Smile

Brian and Marilyn eventually reconciled, and in October 1965, moved into a new home at 1448 Laurel Way in Beverly Hills. Wilson said that he spent five months planning an album that would reflect his growing interest in "the making of music for people on a spiritual level". He recalled having an unexpected rush of "creative ideas" and that he "didn't mind" the constant presence of visitors at his home, "so long as there weren't too many and provided I could cop out and sit, thinking. I had a big Spanish table and I sat there hour after hour making the tunes inside my head [...] I was taking a lot of drugs, fooling around with pills, a lot of pills, and it fouled me up for a while. It got me really introspective".

In December 1965, Tony Asher, a jingle writer whom Wilson had recently met, accepted Wilson's offer to be his writing partner for what became the Beach Boys' next album, Pet Sounds (May 1966). He produced most of Pet Sounds from January to April 1966 at four Hollywood studios, mainly employing his bandmates on vocals and his usual pool of session musicians for the backing tracks. Among the album tracks, he later described "Let's Go Away for Awhile" as "the most satisfying piece of music" he had made to date and "I Just Wasn't Made for These Times" as an autobiographical song "about a guy who was crying because he thought he was too advanced". In 1995, he referred to "Caroline, No" as "probably the best I've ever written".

Released in March 1966, the album's first single, "Caroline, No", marked the first record credited to Wilson as a solo artist. It led to speculation that he was considering leaving the band. Wilson recalled, "I explained to [the rest of the group], 'It's OK. It is only a temporary rift where I have something to say.' I wanted to step out of the group a little bit and, sure enough, I was able to." "Caroline, No" ultimately stalled at number 32. In the U.S., Pet Sounds faced similarly underwhelming sales. Wilson was "mortified" that his artistic growth failed to translate into a number-one album. According to Marilyn, "When it wasn't received by the public the way he thought it would be received, it made him hold back. [...] but he didn't stop. He couldn't stop. He needed to create more."

Thanks to mutual connections, Wilson had been introduced to the Beatles' former press officer Derek Taylor, who was subsequently employed as the Beach Boys' publicist. Responding to Brian's request to inspire a greater public appreciation for his talents, Taylor initiated a media campaign that proclaimed Wilson to be a genius. Taylor's prestige was crucial in offering a credible perspective to those on the outside, and his efforts are widely recognized as instrumental in the album's success in Britain. In turn, however, Wilson resented that the branding had the effect of creating higher public expectations for himself. The fact that the music press had begun undervaluing the contributions of the rest of the group also frustrated him and his bandmates, including Love and Carl Wilson.

For the remainder of 1966, Wilson focused on completing the band's single "Good Vibrations", which became a number-one hit in December, and a new batch of songs written with session musician Van Dyke Parks for inclusion on Smile, the album planned to follow Pet Sounds. Wilson touted the album as a "teenage symphony to God" and continued to involve more people in his social, business, and creative affairs. Parks said that, eventually, "it wasn't just Brian and me in a room; it was Brian and me [...] and all kinds of self-interested people pulling him in various directions." Television producer David Oppenheim, who attended these scenes to film the documentary Inside Pop: The Rock Revolution (1967), characterized Wilson's home as a "playpen of irresponsible people."

1966–1973: Decline

Home studio transition

Smile was never finished, due in large part to Wilson's worsening mental condition and exhaustion. His friends, family, and colleagues often date the project's unraveling and Wilson's onset of erratic behavior to around November 1966 – namely, when he recorded the would-be album track "Mrs. O'Leary's Cow" (or "Fire"). In April 1967, Wilson and his wife put their Laurel Way home up for sale and took residence at a newly purchased mansion on 10452 Bellagio Road in Bel Air. Wilson also set to work on constructing a personal home studio. By then, most of his new contacts had disassociated or were exiled from his social circle.

In May, Derek Taylor announced that the six-months-overdue Smile album had been "scrapped". Wilson explained in a 1968 interview, "We pulled out of that production pace, really because I was about ready to die. I was trying so hard. So, all of a sudden I decided not to try any more." The underwhelming critical and commercial response to the band's July single "Heroes and Villains" has been cited as another exacerbating factor in Wilson's professional and psychological decline.

Starting with Smiley Smile (September 1967), the band made Wilson's home their primary base of recording operations until 1972. The album was also the first in which production was credited to the entire group instead of Wilson alone. Producer Terry Melcher attributed this change to Wilson's self-consciousness over his reputation, unwilling to "put his stamp on records so that peers will have a Brian Wilson track to criticize." In August, Wilson rejoined the live band for two one-off appearances in Honolulu. The shows were recorded for a planned live album, Lei'd in Hawaii, that was never finished.

During the sessions for Wild Honey (December), Brian requested Carl to contribute more to the record-making process. Brian also attempted to produce an album for singer Danny Hutton's new group, Redwood, but after the recording of three songs, including "Time to Get Alone" and "Darlin'", this motion was halted by Mike Love and Carl Wilson, who wanted Brian to focus on the Beach Boys' contractual obligations. Friends (June 1968) was recorded during a period of emotional recovery for Wilson. Although it included more contributions from the rest of the group, he actively led the studio sessions, even on the songs that he did not write. He later referred to it as his second "solo album" (the first being Pet Sounds), as well as his favorite Beach Boys album.

Institutionalization and "Bedroom Tapes"
For the remainder of 1968, Wilson's songwriting output declined substantially, as did his emotional state, leading him to self-medicate with the excessive consumption of food, alcohol, and drugs. Amid the looming financial insolvency of the Beach Boys, he began to supplement his regular use of amphetamines and marijuana with cocaine. Hutton, who had introduced Wilson to cocaine, recalled that Wilson expressed suicidal wishes at the time, and that it was when his "real decline started".

In mid-1968, Wilson was admitted to a psychiatric hospital, possibly of his own volition. His issues were not disclosed to the public, and sessions for 20/20 (February 1969) continued in his absence. Journalist Nik Cohn, writing in 1968, said that Wilson had been rumored to be "increasingly withdrawn, brooding, hermitic [...] and occasionally, he is to be seen in the back of some limousine, cruising around Hollywood, bleary and unshaven, huddled way tight into himself." Once discharged later in the year, Wilson rarely finished any tracks for the band, leaving much of his subsequent output for Carl Wilson to complete.

Regarding Brian's participation in the group's recordings from that time, band engineer Stephen Desper said that Brian remained "indirectly involved with production" through Carl. The bathrobe-clad Wilson would occasionally appear from his bedroom to preview a new song for the group, an event that Melcher likened to Aesop delivering a new fable. Otherwise, he stayed in his bedroom upstairs while his bandmates recorded in the studio down below. He would occasionally visit a session if he had heard a piece of music that he felt should be changed.

Conversely, Dennis Wilson recalled that his elder brother began to have "no involvement at all" with the Beach Boys, which forced the group to "find things that [he] worked on and try and piece it together." Marilyn Wilson recalled that her husband withdrew because of perceived resentment from the group: "It was like, 'OK, you assholes, you think you can do as good as me or whatever – go ahead – you do it. You think it's so easy? You do it.'" Referencing the accusation that the Beach Boys refused to let Brian work, Dennis said, "I would go to his house daily and beg, 'What can I do to help you?' I said, 'Forget recording, forget all of it.' It got to Brian's health."

Journalist Brian Chidester coined "Bedroom Tapes" as a loose umbrella term for Wilson's subsequent unreleased output until 1975, despite the fact that his home studio was dismantled in 1972. Much of the material that Wilson recorded from the epoch remains unreleased and unheard by the public. Chidester states that some of it has been described as "schizophrenia on tape" and "intensely personal songs of gentle humanism and strange experimentation, which reflected on his then-fragile emotional state." Wilson's daughter Wendy remembered, "Where other people might take a run to release some stress, he would go to the piano and write a 5-minute song."

Radiant Radish and Sunflower
Early in 1969, the Beach Boys commenced recording their album Sunflower (August 1970). Wilson was an active participant in the year-long sessions, writing more than an album's worth of material by himself or with collaborators, most of which was left off the record. He recorded a single for the band, "Break Away", that was co-written with his father, after which he was rarely in the studio until August 1969. Due to his poor reputation in the music industry, the Beach Boys struggled to secure a record contract with another label. In May, he revealed to reporters that the group were on the verge of bankruptcy. His remarks had the effect of ruining negotiations with Deutsche Grammophon and nearly compromised the band's imminent tour of the UK and Europe. In July, Wilson opened a short-lived health food store, the Radiant Radish, with his friend Arnie Geller and cousin Steve Korthof.

In August, Sea of Tunes, the band's publishing company that held the rights to their song catalog, was sold to Irving Almo Music for $700,000 (equivalent to $ in ). Wilson signed the consent letter at his father's behest. According to Marilyn, the sale devastated Brian. "It killed him. Killed him. I don't think he talked for days. [...] Brian took it as a personal thing, Murry not believing in him anymore." Around this period, Wilson attempted to drive his vehicle off a cliff, and on another occasion, demanded that he be pushed into and buried in a grave that he had dug in his backyard. He channeled his despondence into the writing of his song "'Til I Die", which he described as the summation of "everything I had to say at the time."

Later in 1969, Wilson produced a collection of spoken-word recordings, A World of Peace Must Come, for poet Stephen Kalinich. In November, Wilson and his band signed to Reprise Records, a subsidiary of Warner Bros. Part of the contract stipulated Wilson's proactive involvement with the group in all albums. Van Dyke Parks, who brokered the deal, said that "They [the band] were considered a problem at that time [...] Everyone at the label just wanted Brian Wilson to come over and write some songs." Before the contract was effectuated, Wilson attended a band meeting with Reprise executives with his face painted bright green. Asked why he did this, Wilson responded, "Just seeing what would happen."

Wilson briefly substituted for Love on the road in March 1970, later calling the experience "the best three days of my life, I guess." In April, he attempted to produce a country and western album for the band's co-manager Fred Vail, Cows in the Pasture, that was never finished. In mid-1970, Wilson was reported to be working on a "chorus of frogs" piece for Kalinich and contemplated scoring an Andy Warhol film about a homosexual surfer.

Spring and Holland stay

Wilson was deeply affected by the poor commercial response to Sunflower and resumed having minimal contributions to the Beach Boys' records. Bruce Johnston characterized him as merely "a visitor" to the sessions for Surf's Up (August 1971). In November 1970, Wilson joined the live band for one-and-a-half dates at the Whisky a Go Go. Following this, Wilson told Melody Maker that although he had been "quite happy living at home", he felt that he was "not as creative as I once was and I'm not participating as much as I should have done." He identified himself as "a kind of drop-out" who sleeps into the afternoon and "potter[s] around doing nothing much."

Speaking to a reporter one year later, in September 1971, Wilson said that he had recently returned to "arranging, doing that more than writing now." In December, while at a concert in Long Beach, manager Jack Rieley coaxed Wilson into performing with the Beach Boys, although his time on stage lasted only minutes. In February 1972, Wilson went to an America gig at the Whisky a Go Go; according to Dan Peek, he "held court like a Mad King as Danny Hutton scurried about like his court jester" during the band's performance.

From late 1971 to early 1972, Wilson and musician David Sandler collaborated on Spring, the first album by Marilyn Wilson and Diane Rovell's new group, American Spring. As with much of Brian's work in the era, his contributions "ebbed and flowed." It was the most involved Wilson had been in an album's production since Friends in 1968.  Meanwhile, Blondie Chaplin stated that Wilson rarely left his bedroom during the recording of Carl and the Passions (April 1972), but "when he came down his contribution was amazing." Wilson's unavailability was such that his image had to be superimposed into the group portrait included in the record's inner sleeve.

During the summer of 1972, Wilson joined his bandmates when they temporarily moved base to Holland, albeit after much cajoling. While living in a Dutch house called "Flowers" and listening repeatedly to Randy Newman's newest album Sail Away, Wilson was inspired to write a fairy tale, Mount Vernon and Fairway, loosely based on his memories listening to the radio at Mike Love's family home as a teenager. The group rejected his proposal to include the fairy tale on their next album, Holland (January 1973). Instead, it was packaged with Holland as a bonus EP. In 1973, Jan Berry (under the alias JAN) released the single "Don't You Just Know It", a duet featuring Wilson. That April, Wilson briefly joined his bandmates onstage during an encore for the group's concert at the Hollywood Palladium.

1973–1975: Recluse period

After his father's death in June 1973, Wilson secluded himself in the chauffeur's quarters of his home, where he spent his time sleeping, abusing drugs and alcohol, overeating, and exhibiting self-destructive behavior. He rarely ventured outside wearing anything but pajamas and later said that his father's death "had a lot to do with my retreating." Wilson's family were eventually forced to take control of his financial affairs due to his irresponsible drug expenditures. This led Brian to occasionally wander the city, begging for rides, drugs, and alcohol. According to Wilson, from 1974 to 1975, he recorded only "skimpy little bits and pieces, little fragments" due to a loss of "the ability to concentrate enough to follow through."

Reflecting on this period, Wilson said that he was preoccupied with snorting cocaine, reading magazines such as Playboy and Penthouse, and "hanging out with Danny Hutton", whose Laurel Canyon house had become the center of Wilson's social life. Although increasingly reclusive during the day, Wilson spent many nights at Hutton's house fraternizing with colleagues such as Alice Cooper and Iggy Pop, who were mutually bemused by an extended Wilson-led singalong of the folk song "Shortnin' Bread". According to Cooper, Wilson proclaimed that it was "the greatest song ever written." Other visitors of Hutton's home included Harry Nilsson, John Lennon, Ringo Starr and Keith Moon. On several occasions, Marilyn Wilson sent her friends to climb Hutton's fence and retrieve her husband.

Of Wilson in the early 1970s, music historian Charles Granata writes, "The stories—many of them dubious—are legendary." Wilson stated in a 2001 interview that he had never met John Lennon, however, Cooper told another story in which he had witnessed Wilson at a party, with Lennon, repeatedly asking fellow attendees to introduce him to the Beatle, one after another. Micky Dolenz, recalling an occasion in which he took LSD with Wilson, Nilsson, and Lennon in Malibu, said that Wilson "played just one note on a piano over and over again". John Sebastian often showed up at Wilson's home "to jam" and later recalled of Wilson's situation, "It wasn't all grimness." Jeff Foskett, then a Beach Boys fan who had visited Wilson's home unannounced, said that Wilson was cordial and belied the popular myths surrounding him, a perception reaffirmed by Wilson's mistress at the time, Debbie Keil.

Paul McCartney and his wife Linda visited Wilson in April 1974, but Wilson refused to let them inside his home. Jimmy Webb reported Wilson's presence at an August session for Nilsson's "Salmon Falls"; he kept in the back of the studio playing "Da Doo Ron Ron" haphazardly on a B3 organ. Later that month, he played on the sessions for Keith Moon's solo album, Two Sides of the Moon, and was photographed at Moon's 28th birthday party (held on August 28 at the Beverly Wilshire Hotel) wearing only his bathrobe. On another occasion that year, Wilson interrupted a set by jazz musician Larry Coryell at The Troubadour by leaping on stage and singing "Be-Bop-A-Lula", again wearing slippers and a bathrobe. Musician Todd Rundgren, who had accompanied Wilson to the concert, later wrote in his memoir, "I've wondered since the Troubadour incident whether the nature of the music had an effect on Brian's actions [...] Perhaps his behavior was actually a precursor to the blurring of the line between audience and performer that the punk movement engendered. Perhaps I had witnessed the birth of a revolution."

The Beach Boys' greatest hits compilation Endless Summer was a surprise success, becoming the band's second number-one U.S. album in October 1974. To take advantage of their sudden resurgence in popularity, Wilson agreed to join his bandmates in Colorado for the recording of a new album at James William Guercio's Caribou Ranch studio. The group completed a few tracks, including "Child of Winter (Christmas Song)", but ultimately abandoned the project. Released as a single at the end of December 1974, "Child of Winter" was their first record that displayed the credit "Produced by Brian Wilson" since 1966.

Early in 1975, while still under contract with Warner Bros., Wilson signed a short-lived sideline production deal with Bruce Johnston and Terry Melcher's Equinox Records. Together, they founded the loose-knit supergroup known as California Music, which also included involvement from Gary Usher, Curt Boettcher, and other Los Angeles musicians. Along with his guest appearances on Johnny Rivers' rendition of "Help Me, Rhonda" and Jackie DeShannon's "Boat to Sail", Wilson's production of California Music's single "Why Do Fools Fall in Love" represents his only "serious" work throughout this period of semi-inactivity.

An event that Wilson remembered as the most embarrassing in his life was when he met Elvis Presley at RCA Victor Studio in 1975 when Presley was recording "Pieces of My Life". Wilson was accordingly "so nervous" that he attempted to karate chop the singer. Also in 1975, NME published an extended three-part piece by journalist Nick Kent, "The Last Beach Movie", which depicted Wilson in a highly unfavorable light. Johnston stated in another music magazine that Wilson became "suicidally depressed" after reading the article.

1975–1982: "Brian's Back!"

15 Big Ones, Love You, and Adult/Child
Wilson's overconsumption of food, cigarettes, alcohol, and other drugs – which now sometimes included heroin – further strained his marriage to Marilyn, who responded by threatening her husband with divorce or committing him to a mental institution. To help reverse his physical decline, in 1975, band manager Stephen Love appointed his brother Stan, a basketball player, as Wilson's bodyguard, trainer, and caretaker. Marilyn also called in the band's lawyers and accountants to remind her husband that, pursuant to the terms of his contract with Warner Bros., he was legally obliged to write and produce for the Beach Boys or else he would be sued by the label and lose his home. Stan was successful in improving Wilson's health but after several months, went back to working with the NBA. Wilson then volunteered into psychologist Eugene Landy's radical 24-hour therapy program in October.

Under Landy's care, Wilson became more stable and socially engaged, with his productivity increasing once again. Throughout 1976, the tagline "Brian's Back!" became a major promotional tool for the band's concert tours, as well as their July release 15 Big Ones, the first Beach Boys album that credited Wilson as the sole producer since Pet Sounds. The sessions were fraught with tension, as Wilson's bandmates fought against his wish to record a covers album and did not feel that he was ready to assume control of their studio proceedings. Ultimately, a compromise was reached, with the album including a mix of covers and originals.

Starting on July 2, 1976, Wilson made regular concert appearances with his bandmates for the first time since December 1964, singing and alternating between bass guitar and piano. In August, Wilson traveled with his group for concert dates outside of California, the first time he had done so since March 1970. NBC also premiered a Lorne Michaels-produced television special about the band, called simply The Beach Boys, which included recent concert footage, interviews, and a comedy sketch involving Wilson and NBC's Saturday Night cast members Dan Aykroyd and John Belushi. Despite its success, the "Brian's Back" promotion proved controversial.  Wilson's remarks to interviewers suggested that he had yet to fully recover from his addictions, and he remarked on one occasion that he "'felt like a prisoner". A concert reviewer noted that Wilson "seemed uncomfortable on stage" and contributed "nil".

From October 1976 to January 1977, Wilson produced a large collection of studio recordings, largely by himself while his bandmates were preoccupied with other personal and creative affairs. Released in April 1977, The Beach Boys Love You was the Beach Boys' first album to feature Wilson as a primary composer since Wild Honey in 1967. Originally titled Brian Loves You, Wilson played virtually all of the instruments on the album. Once again, he was credited as producer, although Carl was credited as "mixdown producer". Band engineer Earle Mankey described it as "Brian Wilson giving what he had [to make] a serious, autobiographical album." Asked for his favorite Beach Boys albums in a 1998 interview, Wilson responded with 15 Big Ones and Love You.

Wilson's family and management relieved Landy of his services at the end of 1976, when he raised his monthly fees to $20,000 (equivalent to $ in ). Shortly afterward, Wilson told a journalist that he felt the treatment had been a success despite the exorbitant fees. Landy's role as Wilson's handler and constant supervisor was immediately taken over by Wilson's cousins, Steve Korthof and Stan Love, and a professional model, Rocky Pamplin, who had been friends with Love in college. Wilson maintained a healthy, drug-free disposition for several months under their auspices.

In early 1977, Wilson produced Adult/Child, the intended follow-up to Love You, but it was kept unreleased due to artistic disputes. In March, the Beach Boys signed to CBS Records, whose contract stipulated that Wilson compose most of the material on all of the group's albums. According to Gaines, "When Brian signed the contract, he cried, knowing he would now have to go back to the studio full-time." Referencing the sessions for M.I.U. Album (October 1978), Wilson said that he went through a "mental blank-out" during this period. Wilson was credited as the album's "executive producer", likely for contractual reasons. Stan said that Wilson was "depressed" and "didn't want to write with [Mike] anymore, but of course Mike tried to hang on." Around this time, Wilson attempted to produce an album for Pamplin that would have featured the Honeys as backing vocalists.

Hospitalizations and "cocaine sessions"

Wilson entered a period of regression over the subsequent years – particularly, after the band's disastrous tour of Australia in 1978 – and found ways of obtaining cocaine and barbiturates without the knowledge of his handlers. In mid-1978, a day after he overdosed on a combination of drugs, he disappeared from his family and went hitchhiking in West Hollywood, ultimately arriving at a gay bar, where he played piano for drinks. After this, he was driven to Mexico by a bar patron, and then hitchhiked to San Diego. Days later, police officers discovered Wilson lying under a tree in Balboa Park without shoes, money, or a wallet. They promptly took him to Alvarado Hospital for detox from alcohol poisoning. Once discharged, Wilson immediately joined his bandmates for the recording of L.A. (Light Album) (March 1979), but after producing some demos, requested that Bruce Johnston helm the project. Korthof recalled, "Brian was real weird then, real quiet, not saying much. Real depressed."

With his marriage disintegrated, Wilson moved from his mansion on Bellagio Road to a small house on Sunset Boulevard, where he descended further into alcoholism. Following an incident in which he attacked his doctor during a visit, Wilson spent several months institutionalized at Brotzman Memorial Hospital. He was initially admitted in November 1978 for three months, discharged for one month, and then readmitted. While there, in January 1979, Stan Love and Rocky Pamplin were dismissed of their services. Wilson was released from the hospital in March. Afterward, he rented a house in Santa Monica and was arranged to be taken care of by a "round-the-clock" psychiatric nursing team. Later, he purchased a home in Pacific Palisades. His bandmates implored him to produce their next album, Keepin' the Summer Alive (March 1980), but he was unable or unwilling.

Brian remained engrossed in his overeating and drug habits, spurred on partly through the influence of Dennis. To entice his brother into writing and producing songs, Dennis would sometimes offer him McDonald's hamburgers and cocaine. Jon Stebbins' biography of Dennis includes a remark from an anonymous source, "Brian would chastise Dennis for his drinking and then lean over and snort a huge line of cocaine. He'd be smoking a cigarette and a joint and tell Dennis he shouldn't drink." According to Stebbins, the brothers held "secret" recording sessions together; these were concealed due to the fact that "no effort was spared to keep Brian and Dennis apart. [...] whenever certain members of the Beach Boys clan found out that Brian was sequestered with Dennis, they would come and take him away, literally slamming the door on the creative process."

Bootlegged tapes of the brothers' collaborations – produced in 1980 and 1981 at the Venice Beach home studio of musicologist and film executive Garby Leon – were later referred to as the "cocaine sessions" or "hamburger sessions" by Beach Boys fans.  In early 1981, Pamplin and Stan Love were convicted of assaulting Dennis in his home after the former bodyguards had heard that Dennis had been supplying Brian with drugs. In early 1982, Brian signed a trust document that gave Carl control of his finances and Brother Records, Inc. (BRI) voting power, and was involuntarily admitted to a three-day stay at St. John's Hospital in Santa Monica. By this time, Brian's diet included up to four or five steaks a day, as well as copious amounts of ice cream, cookies, and cakes. At the end of the year, his weight exceeded .

1982–1991: Second Landy intervention

Recovery and the Wilson Project

In 1982, after Wilson overdosed on a combination of alcohol, cocaine, and other psychoactive drugs, his family and management successfully coordinated an elaborate ruse to convince him to volunteer back into Landy's program. When approached by the band, Landy had agreed to treat Wilson again, but only if he was to be given total control over Brian's affairs without interference from anyone. Additionally, Landy promised that he would need no more than two years to rehabilitate Wilson. On November 5, Wilson was falsely told by the group that he was penniless and no longer a member of the Beach Boys, and if he wanted to continue receiving his share of income from the touring band's earnings, he had to reenlist Landy as his caretaker.

Wilson acquiesced and was subsequently taken to Hawaii, where he was isolated from friends and family and put on a rigorous diet and health regimen. Coupled with counseling sessions, which involved reteaching Wilson basic social etiquette, this therapy was successful in bringing him back to physical health. By March 1983, he had returned to Los Angeles and was moved by Landy into a home in Malibu, where Wilson lived with several of Landy's aides and was cut off from contacting many of his own friends and family, including his children and ex-wife Marilyn.

Between 1983 and 1986, Landy charged about $430,000 annually (equivalent to $ in ). When Landy requested more money, Carl Wilson was obliged to give away a quarter of Brian's publishing royalties. Landy soon extended to being Brian's creative and financial partner. Eventually, Landy became his representative at BRI corporate meetings. Landy was accused of creating a Svengali-like environment for Wilson, controlling every movement in his life, including his musical direction. Responding to such allegations, Wilson said, "People say that Dr. Landy runs my life, but the truth is, I'm in charge." He later claimed that, in mid-1985, he attempted suicide by swimming out to sea as far as he could before one of Landy's aides brought him back to shore.

As Wilson's recovery consolidated, he actively participated in the recording of the album The Beach Boys (June 1985). The publicity surrounding the release labelled it as a "comeback" for Wilson. Afterward, he stopped working with his bandmates on a regular basis to focus on launching a solo career with Landy's assistance. Starting in 1986, Wilson engaged his former collaborator Gary Usher in writing songs and recording demos for his prospective solo album at Usher's studio. They recorded about a dozens songs in varying stages of completion, most of which remain unreleased. This collection of recordings came to be known as "the Wilson Project".

Brian Wilson and Sweet Insanity

During this period, Wilson occasionally joined his bandmates at concerts, and he performed his first gig as a solo artist at several charity concerts around Los Angeles. In January 1987, Wilson agreed to a solo contract offered by Sire Records president Seymour Stein, who stipulated his own choice of co-producer, multi-instrumentalist Andy Paley, to keep Wilson on-task. In exchange, Landy was allowed to take on an "executive producer" role. Other producers, including Russ Titelman and Lenny Waronker, were soon involved, and difficulties between them and Landy ensued throughout the recording sessions.

Released in July 1988, Brian Wilson was met with favorable reviews and moderate sales, peaking at number 52 in the U.S. It included "Rio Grande", an eight-minute Western suite written in a similar vein to the songs from Smile. The LP's release was largely overshadowed by the controversy surrounding Landy and the success of the Beach Boys' "Kokomo", the band's first number-one hit since "Good Vibrations", and their first hit that had no involvement from Wilson.

In 1989, Wilson and Landy formed the company Brains and Genius, by which time Landy had ceased to be Wilson's therapist on legal record and had surrendered his license to practice psychology in the state of California. Together, they worked on Wilson's second solo album, Sweet Insanity, with Landy co-writing almost all of the material. Sire rejected the album due to Landy's lyrics and the inclusion of Wilson's rap song "Smart Girls". In May 1989, Wilson recorded "Daddy's Little Girl" for the film She's Out of Control, and in June, was among the featured guests on the charity single "The Spirit of the Forest". Wilson also collaborated with Linda Ronstadt on her single "Adios".

Lawsuits and conservatorship
Throughout the 1990s, Wilson was embroiled in numerous lawsuits. In August 1989, he filed a $100 million suit against Irving Music to recover the song publishing rights that had been sold by his father decades earlier. Although Wilson failed to recover the rights, he was awarded $10 million through an out of court settlement in April 1992. By 1990, Wilson was estranged from the Beach Boys, with his bandmates deliberately scheduling recording sessions that Wilson could not attend. According to Brother Records president Elliot Lott, the band also twice rejected Wilson's offers to produce an album for them.

In October 1991, Wilson's first memoir Wouldn't It Be Nice: My Own Story was published. According to biographer Peter Ames Carlin, in addition to plagiarizing excerpts from earlier biographies, the contents of the book ranged from Wilson's castigations against his bandmates to passages that "read like depositions for their various court cases". The book prompted defamation lawsuits from Love, Al Jardine, Carl Wilson, and his mother Audree Wilson. Following a conservatorship suit filed by Wilson's family in May 1991, Wilson and Landy's partnership was dissolved in December, with a restraining order enacted soon thereafter.

A month after Wilson was awarded $10 million from his Irving Almo lawsuit, in May 1992, he was sued by Mike Love for decades-long neglected royalties and songwriting credits. In December 1994, the jury ruled in favor of Love, who was awarded $5 million and a share of future royalties from Wilson. Another lawsuit, this time filed by Wilson against his former conservator Jerome Billet, was enacted in September 1995. Wilson sought $10 million, alleging that Billet "failed to supervise the lawyers" overseeing the suits between Wilson, Irving Music, and Love. According to Melinda, when she and Wilson married in 1995, "we were in the midst of nine separate lawsuits" that were not all resolved until the early 2000s.

1992–2022: Career resurgence and touring

Paley sessions, Orange Crate Art, and Imagination

Wilson's productivity increased significantly following his disassociation from Landy. The day after the restraining order had been placed on Landy, Wilson had renewed his songwriting partnership with Andy Paley and, together, subsequently wrote and recorded a large collection of material for a proposed Beach Boys album throughout the early to mid-1990s. Concurrently, Wilson worked with Don Was on a documentary about his life, Brian Wilson: I Just Wasn't Made for These Times (1995). The soundtrack consisted of rerecordings of Beach Boys songs and was released as Wilson's second solo album in August. In 1993, Wilson accepted an offer to record an album of songs written by Van Dyke Parks. Credited to the pair, Orange Crate Art was released in October 1995. In the late 1990s, Wilson and Asher rekindled their writing partnership and wrote some songs together. One of them "Everything I Need", appeared on The Wilsons (1997), a project involving Wilson and his daughters.

Although some recordings were completed with the Beach Boys, the Wilson/Paley project was ultimately abandoned. Instead, Wilson co-produced the band's 1996 album Stars and Stripes Vol. 1 with Joe Thomas, owner of River North Records and former professional wrestler. In 1997, Wilson moved to St. Charles, Illinois to work on a solo album project with Thomas  Released in June 1998, Wilson described his third album, Imagination, as "really a Brian Wilson/Joe Thomas album." It peaked at number 88 in the U.S. and was criticized by fans for its homogenized radio pop sound. Shortly before the album's release, Wilson suffered the loss of what remained of his immediate family with the deaths of his brother Carl and their mother Audree.

Numerous reports from this period suggested that Wilson was being pressured to have a career and exploited by those close to him, including Melinda. Wilson's daughter Carnie referred to Ledbetter as "Melandy", and Ginger Blake, a family friend, characterized Wilson as "complacent and basically surrendered". Mike Love stated that he was in favor of reuniting the Beach Boys with Wilson, however, "Brian usually has someone in his life who tells him what to do. And now that person kinda wants to keep him away from us. I don't know why. You'd have to ask her, I guess." Asked if he still considered himself a Beach Boy, Wilson replied, "No. Maybe a little bit." Referencing Wilson's longtime dependencies on his father and Landy,  Westwords Michael Roberts wrote in 2000 that "his public statements over time have tended to reiterate those of whoever's supervising his activities at the moment."

From March to July 1999, Wilson embarked on his first ever solo tour, playing about a dozen dates in the U.S. and Japan. His supporting band consisted of former Beach Boys touring musician Jeff Foskett (guitar), Wondermints members Darian Sahanaja (keyboards), Nick Walusko (guitar), Mike D'Amico (percussion, drums), and Probyn Gregory (guitar, horns), and Chicago-based session musicians Scott Bennett (various), Paul Mertens (woodwinds), Bob Lizik (bass), Todd Sucherman (drums), and Taylor Mills (backing vocals). Wilson toured the U.S. again in October. In 2000, Wilson said that the tours "so far [have] been great. I feel much more comfortable on stage now. I have a good band behind me. It's a much better band than the Beach Boys were."

In August 1999, Wilson filed suit against Thomas, seeking damages and a declaration which freed him to work on his next album without involvement from Thomas. Thomas reciprocated with his own suit, citing that Ledbetter had "schemed against and manipulated" him and Wilson. The case was settled out of court.

Live albums and Brian Wilson Presents Smile

Early in 2000, Wilson released his first live album, Live at the Roxy Theatre. Later in the year, he embarked on a series of U.S. concert dates that included the first full live performances of Pet Sounds, with Wilson backed by a 55-piece orchestra. Van Dyke Parks was commissioned to write an overture arrangement of Wilson's songs. Critic Geoff Edgers wrote that the historical importance of the tour was comparable to that of Syd Barrett or J.D. Salinger emerging from their decades-long reclusion. Although the tour was positively received by critics, it was poorly attended, and financial losses ran up to hundreds of thousands of dollars. In March 2001, Wilson attended a tribute show held in his honor at the Radio City Music Hall in New York, where he sang "Heroes and Villains" before a public audience for the first time in decades.

The Pet Sounds tour was followed by another in 2002, this time playing in Europe, with a sold-out four-night residency at the Royal Festival Hall in London. Recordings from these concerts were released in the form of a second live album, Brian Wilson Presents Pet Sounds Live (June 2002). Over the next year, Wilson continued sporadic recording sessions for his fourth solo album, Gettin' In over My Head. Released in June 2004, the record featured guest appearances from Van Dyke Parks, Paul McCartney, Eric Clapton, and Elton John. Some of the songs were leftovers from Wilson's past collaborations with Paley and Thomas.

To the surprise of his associates, Wilson agreed to follow the Pet Sounds tours with concert dates that would feature songs from the unfinished Smile album arranged for live performance. Sahanaja assisted Wilson with the sequencing, and later, they were joined by Parks, who was brought in to contribute additional lyrics. Brian Wilson Presents Smile (BWPS) premiered at the Royal Festival Hall in London in February 2004. Encouraged by the positive reception, a studio album adaptation was soon recorded. Wilson's engineer Mark Linett recalled that when he handed Wilson the CD of the completed album, "I swear you could see something change in him. And he's been different ever since." According to Sahanaja, Wilson held the CD to his chest and said, "'I'm going to hold this dear to my heart.' He was trembling."

Released in September, BWPS debuted at number 13 on the Billboard 200, the highest chart position of any album by the Beach Boys or Brian Wilson since 1976's 15 Big Ones, and the highest ever debut for a Beach Boys-related album. It was later certified platinum. In support of BWPS, Wilson embarked on a world tour that included stops in the US, Europe, and Japan. Sahanaja told Australian Musician, "In six years of touring this is the happiest we've ever seen Brian, I mean consistently happy". In July 2005, Wilson performed a concert at Live 8 in Berlin watched by a television audience of about three million.

In September 2005, Wilson arranged a charity drive to aid victims of Hurricane Katrina, wherein people who donated $100 or more would receive a personal phone call from Wilson. According to the website, over $250K was raised. In November, Mike Love sued Wilson over "shamelessly misappropriating [...] Love's songs, likeness, and the Beach Boys trademark, as well as the 'Smile' album itself" in the promotion of BWPS. The lawsuit was ultimately dismissed on grounds that it was meritless.

Covers albums, That Lucky Old Sun, and Beach Boys reunion

In October 2005,  Arista Records released Wilson's album What I Really Want for Christmas, which contained two new originals by Wilson. To celebrate the 40th anniversary of Pet Sounds, Wilson embarked on a brief tour in November 2006. Al Jardine accompanied Wilson for the tour. In 2007, the Southbank Centre in London commissioned Wilson to create another song cycle in the style of Smile. With Scott Bennett, Wilson reconfigured a collection of songs that they had recently written and recorded together. The result, That Lucky Old Sun, was a semi-autobiographical conceptual piece about California. One year after Wilson premiered the work in London, a studio-recorded version of the piece was released as his seventh solo album in September 2008. It received generally favorable reviews.

Around this time, Wilson announced that he was developing another concept album, titled Pleasure Island: A Rock Fantasy. Accordingly: "It's about some guys who took a hike, and they found a place called Pleasure Island. And they met all kinds of chicks, and they went on rides and — it's just a concept. I haven't developed it yet. I think people are going to love it — it could be the best thing I've ever done."

In 2009, Wilson was asked by Walt Disney Records to record an album of Disney songs. He accepted on the condition that he could also record an album of George Gershwin songs as part of the deal. The latter, Brian Wilson Reimagines Gershwin, was released in August 2010; it reached number 26 on the Billboard 200 and topped Billboards Jazz Albums chart. Wilson embarked on a concert tour in which he performed the album in its entirety. In October 2011, the record was followed by In the Key of Disney, which peaked at number 83 in the U.S. The album was largely overshadowed by the release of The Smile Sessions one week later.

Whether Wilson had truly consented to his semi-regular touring schedule since the 2000s remained a subject of debate among fans. Wilson himself frequently stated that he enjoyed live performances, however, writing in his 2011 book about the Beach Boys, Jon Stebbins concluded, "His handlers, managers, and wife insist that he works. It's all a bit Landy-like when you look behind the curtain." Stebbins referred to a "recent interview [in which Brian was asked] what he disliked the most about touring, [and] Brian replied that it was going on stage and performing. [...] Upon hearing Brian say that, his 'handler' quickly reminded Brian, through a fake smile, that he loved performing." Asked about Wilson's alleged exploitation in an interview, Jeff Foskett denied the reports.

In mid-2011, Wilson reunited with his bandmates to rerecord "Do It Again" surreptitiously for a potential 50th anniversary album. Rumors that the group would reunite for a world tour soon appeared in the music press. Wilson stated in a September report that he was not participating in the tour with his bandmates. "I don't really like working with the guys, but it all depends on how we feel and how much money's involved. Money's not the only reason I made records, but it does hold a place in our lives." Wilson ultimately agreed to the tour, which lasted until September 2012, and an album, That's Why God Made the Radio, released in June 2012. By then, Wilson had renewed his creative partnership with Joe Thomas. Although Wilson was listed as the album's producer, Thomas was credited with "recording", while Mike Love was "executive producer".

No Pier Pressure and At My Piano 

In June 2013, Wilson's website announced that he was recording and self-producing new material with Don Was, Al Jardine, David Marks, former Beach Boy Blondie Chaplin, and guitarist Jeff Beck. It stated that the material might be split into three albums: one of new pop songs, another of mostly instrumental tracks with Beck, and another of interwoven tracks dubbed "the suite" which initially began form as the closing four tracks of That's Why God Made the Radio. In January 2014, Wilson declared in an interview that the Beck collaborations would not be released.

In September 2014, Wilson attended the premiere of the Bill Pohlad-directed biopic of his life, Love & Mercy, at the Toronto International Film Festival. Wilson had contributed a song to the film, "One Kind of Love", that was nominated for Best Original Song at the 2016 Golden Globe Awards. In October 2014, BBC released a newly recorded version of "God Only Knows" with guest appearances by Wilson, Brian May, Elton John, Jake Bugg, Stevie Wonder, Lorde, and many others. It was recorded to celebrate the launch of BBC Music. A week later, Wilson was featured as a guest vocalist on the Emile Haynie single "Falling Apart". Wilson's cover of Paul McCartney's "Wanderlust" was released on the tribute album The Art of McCartney in November.

Released in April 2015, No Pier Pressure marked another collaboration between Wilson and Joe Thomas, featuring guest appearances from Jardine, Marks, Chaplin, and others. Fans reacted negatively to the announcement that Wilson would be recording a duets album, describing it as a "cash-in". A Facebook post attributed to Wilson responded to the feedback: "In my life in music, I've been told too many times not to fuck with the formula, but as an artist it's my job to do that." The album reached the U.S. top 30, but critical reaction was mixed due to the adult contemporary arrangements and excessive use of autotune. Later in the year, Sahanaja was asked if Wilson was reaching the end of his career as a performing artist. He answered, "I gotta be honest. Each of the past five years I thought to myself, 'Well, this is probably going to be it.'"

In March 2016, Wilson embarked on the Pet Sounds 50th Anniversary World Tour, promoted as his final performances of the album. In October, his second memoir, I Am Brian Wilson, was published. It was written by journalist Ben Greenman through several months of interviews with Wilson.  Also in October, Wilson announced a new album, Sensitive Music for Sensitive People, comprising originals and rock and roll cover songs. He described the name as a "working title" and said that recording would begin in December.

Asked about negative remarks made against him in Wilson's book, Love disputed that Wilson's printed statements were actually spoken by him and suggested that Wilson is "not in charge of his life, like I am mine. [...] But, I don't like to put undue pressure on him [...] because I know he has a lot of issues." During the filming of the 2021 documentary Brian Wilson: Long Promised Road, Wilson remarked that he had not "had a friend to talk to in three years."

In a 2016 Rolling Stone interview, Wilson responded to a question about retiring: "Retirement? Oh, man. No retiring. If I retired I wouldn't know what to do with my time. What would I do? Sit there and go, 'Oh, I don't want to be 74'? I'd rather get on the road and do concerts and take airplane flights." Similarly, in 2017, Wilson told Rolling Stone that he had not written a song since 2012, but still had no intentions of retiring from the road. In 2019, Wilson embarked on a co-headlining tour with the Zombies, performing selections from Friends and Surf's Up.

Around this time, Wilson had two back surgeries that left him unable to get around without a walker. Wilson was still performing concerts shows at the time the COVID-19 pandemic emerged in early 2020. He resumed his concert touring in August 2021, with many dates rescheduled to the next year. Two releases followed in November. The first, At My Piano, was issued by Decca and consists of new instrumental rerecordings of Wilson's songs played by himself on piano. The second was the soundtrack to Long Promised Road, which includes new and previously unreleased recordings by Wilson.

2022–present: Retirement from touring 

On July 26, 2022, Wilson played his final concert as part of a joint tour with Chicago at the Pine Knob Music Theatre in Clarkston, Michigan, where he was reported to have "sat rigid and expressionless" throughout the performance. Days later, he cancelled his remaining tour dates for that year, with his management citing "unforeseen health reasons" as the reason. During a January 2023 appearance on a Beach Boys fan podcast, Wilson's daughter Carnie reported that her father was "probably not going to tour anymore, which is heartbreaking".

Artistry

Influences

Early influences

Chord-wise, Wilson's main music influences come from rock and roll, doo-wop, and vocal-based jazz. At about age two, he heard Glenn Miller's 1943 rendition of Gershwin's Rhapsody in Blue, which had a profound emotional impact on him. Wilson said, "It sort of became a general life theme [for me]." As a child, his favorite artists included Roy Rogers, Carl Perkins, Bill Haley, Elvis Presley, Henry Mancini, and Rosemary Clooney. Asked for the first music that he had felt compelled to learn and sing repeatedly, Wilson answered with Haley's 1954 recording of "Rock Around the Clock". Most of Wilson's education in music composition and jazz harmony came from deconstructing the harmonies of his favorite vocal group, the Four Freshmen, whose repertoire included songs by Gershwin, Jerome Kern, and Cole Porter.

Wilson credited his mother with introducing him to the Four Freshmen, and he attributed his love for harmonies and the human voice to the group, whom he considered had a "groovy sectional sound". Their 1956 album Freshmen Favorites was the first pop album that Wilson listened to in its entirety and he cited Voices in Love (1958) as "probably the greatest single vocal album I've ever heard". He referred to their arranger, Dick Reynolds, as "just about a God to me" and later employed his services for the Beach Boys' Christmas album and Adult/Child. It is likely that Wilson learned virtually the entirety of the Four Freshmen's recorded repertoire up through 1961, after which his obsession with the group was reduced.

Inquired for his music tastes in 1961, Wilson replied, "top 10", referring to essentially any of the top hits of the era. Particular favorites included many songs by Chuck Berry, the Coasters, and the Everly Brothers. Later in his career, Wilson recorded renditions of certain favorites, including the Everly Brothers' "Devoted to You" (1958), the Robins' "Smokey Joe's Cafe" (1955),  the Olympics' "Hully Gully" (1960), the Shirelles' "Mama Said" (1961), and the Regents' "Barbara Ann" (1961).

He disliked surf music when the Beach Boys began forming; in the estimation of biographer Timothy White, Wilson instead aspired for a "new plateau midway between Gershwin and the best Four Freshmen material". Gershwin's influence became more apparent in Wilson's music later in his career, particularly after the 1970s, when he dedicated himself to learning the violin parts from Rhapsody in Blue for the first time. In 1994, Wilson recorded a choral version of Rhapsody in Blue with Van Dyke Parks.

Spector and Bacharach

Phil Spector's influence on Wilson is well-documented. In a 1966 article, Wilson referred to Spector as "the single most influential producer." He reaffirmed in 2000 that Spector was "probably the biggest influence of all [...] Anybody with a good ear can hear that I was influenced by Spector. I would listen to his records and pick up ideas." Wilson particularly admired Spector's treatment of "the song as one giant instrument. [...] Size was so important to him, how big everything sounded. And he had the best drums I ever heard." He often cited Spector's Christmas album as his favorite album of all time.

Wilson stated that he was made aware of Spector's records via Bob Norberg. According to White, the Crystals' Spector-produced hit "He's a Rebel" (1962) "hit Brian hardest" when it was released. Wilson recalled that when he heard the Ronettes' 1963 hit "Be My Baby" for the first time through his car radio, he immediately pulled over to the side of the road and deemed it the greatest record he had ever heard. His 2016 memoir states that he met Spector only a few days later.

Most accounts suggest that Spector had not shared the same admiration for Wilson's music, but according to Larry Levine, "Brian was one of the few people in the music business Phil respected. [...] Phil would tell anybody who listened that Brian was one of the great producers." He remembered that when Wilson attended Spector's sessions, Wilson "would ask questions, but [he] always understood what was happening in the studio. They had a good rapport."

After Spector's "You've Lost That Lovin' Feelin'" (1964) became a hit for the Righteous Brothers, Wilson personally phoned Spector's co-writers, Barry Mann and Cynthia Weil, to praise it as the "greatest record ever" and expressed a wish to be their co-writer on future songs. Wilson unsuccessfully submitted two of his compositions to the producer: "Don't Worry Baby" and "Don't Hurt My Little Sister"; both written with the Ronettes in mind. In 1977, Wilson wrote a 1950s style love song, "Mona", whose lyrics discuss some of his favorite songs by Spector, including "Da Doo Ron Ron" and "Be My Baby".

Burt Bacharach is among the "often-overlooked" influences on Wilson's music. He named Bacharach (along with Spector and Chuck Berry) as his main influences chord-wise. In 1966, he said, "Burt Bacharach and Hal David are more like me. They're also the best pop team – per se – today. As a producer, Bacharach has a very fresh, new approach." He later said that Bacharach's work had a "profound" influence that "got me going in a [different] direction." Wilson produced renditions of Bacharach's "My Little Red Book" and "Walk On By" in 1967 and 1968, respectively, but left the recordings unreleased. Asked for anybody's songs that he wished he had written, he listed three: "You've Lost That Lovin' Feelin'", "Be My Baby", and Bacharach's "Here I Am".

Others

Although it is often reported that the Beach Boys and the Beatles reciprocated each other's musical developments, Wilson rebuked the suggestion that he had been influenced by his rivals. "The Beatles inspired me. They didn't influence me." Carl Wilson supported that his brother preferred the music of Phil Spector over the Beatles. "He loved the Beatles' later music when they evolved and started making intelligent, masterful music, but before that Phil was it." In a 1969 interview, Mike Love rejected the notion of Brian being influenced by the Beatles, adding that "Brian was in his own world, believe me."

Wilson acknowledged that he was highly self-conscious of the Beatles as a cultural force. He recalled that he and Mike Love immediately felt threatened by the Beatles and added that he knew the Beach Boys could never match the excitement created by the Beatles as performers, and that this realization led him to concentrate his efforts on trying to outdo them in the recording studio. In a 2002 interview, Wilson said that each new Beatles release, particularly over 1964–65, pushed him "to try something new" in his work. He praised Paul McCartney's bass playing, calling it "technically fantastic, but his harmonies and the psychological thing he brings to the music comes through. Psychologically he is really strong [...] The other thing that I could never get was how versatile he was. [...] we would spend ages trying to work out where he got all those different types of songs from."

Granata writes that Wilson also admired Frankie Valli and the Four Seasons, although Wilson rarely singled them out in interviews. Wilson has referred to Motown as another influence. Cultural historian Hal Lifson argued that Wilson's "symphonic element" was influenced by Disney film soundtracks such as Mary Poppins (1964). In 1986, Wilson told ethnomusicologist David Toop, "I listened to a lot of orchestral music. I learned a lot of tricks too. Nelson Riddle taught me a lot about arranging." Asked about soul music in 2004, he cited Smokey Robinson and Stevie Wonder as influences. Wendy Carlos's 1969 album Switched-On Bach, described by Wilson as "one of the most electrifying records" he had ever heard, influenced his use of synthesizers.

In 1976, Wilson commented that he felt contemporary popular music had lacked the artistic integrity it once had, with Queen's "Bohemian Rhapsody" (1975) being one exception. In a 1988 interview, he named the 1982 compilation Stevie Wonder's Original Musiquarium I and Paul Simon's 1986 release Graceland among his ten favorite albums of all time. In 2007, he cited Billy Joel as his favorite pianist. , Wilson maintained that he does not listen to modern music, only "oldies but goodies".

Singing

Through listening to Four Freshmen records, Wilson developed a distinctive singing style—a versatile head voice that allowed him to sing high without engaging in falsetto, although he did also sing in falsetto on some Beach Boys songs. Wilson recalled that he "learned how to sing falsetto" through listening to the Four Freshmen's renditions of songs like "I'm Always Chasing Rainbows", "I'll Remember April", and "Day by Day". Another strong influence was Rosemary Clooney, whom he said "taught me to sing with love in my heart [...] I would sing along with [her recording of "Hey There"], studying her phrasing, and that's how I learned to sing with feeling." In 1966, he said that the highest note he could sing was D5.

Wilson typically sang in a pure tenor voice until later in his adult life, when he began invoking his tenor only on rare occasions. He was sometimes embarrassed by his singing, as he was worried of being perceived as a homosexual, and would avoid performing in a high voice for this reason. After the early 1970s, Wilson's voice degraded due to his excessive consumption of cigarettes and cocaine. 15 Big Ones marked the introduction of what biographer Peter Ames Carlin terms Wilson's "baritone croak". In a 1999 interview, Wilson remarked, "You know Bob Dylan? Well, live, you know, he sort of has this harsh, raspy voice. That's what I have. I'm like the Bob Dylan of the '90s."

Songwriting

Musical structures

Explaining his writing process in 1966, Wilson stated that he started with finding a basic chord pattern and rhythm that he described as "feels", or "brief note sequences, fragments of ideas", and "once they're out of my head and into the open air, I can see them and touch them firmly. They're not 'feels' anymore." He wrote that he aspired to write songs that appear "simple, no matter how complex it really is." In a 2009 interview, he stated that his favorite chord is E major seventh, while his favorite key signatures to play in are B, C, E, and E.

Common devices in Wilson's musical structures include:
 jazz chords (such as sevenths and ninths)
 chord inversions (especially a tonic with a fifth in the bass)
 prominent, melodic bass parts
 functional ambiguity
 key changes within verse and choruses (including "truck driver's modulations")
 I – IV – I – V chord progressions (derived from "Da Doo Ron Ron")
 a circle of fifths run that begins with the mediant (iii) (derived from "Be My Baby")
 stepwise-falling melodic lines
 stepwise diatonic rises (such as I – iii – IV – V)
 whole-step root movement (such as I – VII – VI – V)
 tertian movement
 chromatic harmony (including diminished seventh chords)
 chromatic bass descents (most prominently demonstrated in "Our Prayer")
 alternations between supertonic and dominant chords (ii – V) or tonic and flattened subtonic chords (I – VII)
 sudden breaks into a cappella (another technique borrowed from the Four Freshmen).
 "syncopated exercises and counterpoints piled on top of jittery eighth-note clusters and loping shuffle grooves", features that producer Alan Boyd said took "an almost manic edge" in Wilson's work during the 1970s

Wilson also composed his own arrangements – an unusual practice among rock groups of the 1960s.

Lyrics

Wilson typically wrote songs in conjunction with another lyricist, although there are several examples of songs in which he composed both the music and words alone, including "Surfer Girl", "Girl Don't Tell Me", "I'm Bugged at My Ol' Man", "Busy Doin' Nothin'", "This Whole World", "'Til I Die", and "Love and Mercy". In his 2008 book Dark Mirror: The Pathology of the Singer-Songwriter, Donald Brackett identifies Wilson as "the Carl Sandburg and Robert Frost of popular music—deceptively simple, colloquial in phrasing, with a spare and evocative lyrical style embedded in the culture that created it."

Most of Wilson's songs relate to introspective themes. Although the Beach Boys were known for their surfing imagery, his songs typically avoided such topics when he wrote with collaborators outside of his band's circle, such as in the 1963 songs "Lonely Sea" and "In My Room". In several of his other songs, the male object or narrator is portrayed as a "loser", such as on "She Knows Me Too Well", "Don't Hurt My Little Sister", "Merry Christmas, Baby", and "All Dressed Up for School". Brackett argues that although "John Lennon came close", there have been "[v]ery few singer-songwriters [that have expressed] intense fragility or emotional vulnerability as deeply or severely as Brian Wilson did."

Other recurring themes in Wilson's songs include feminine objectification, youthful innocence, slice of life stories or observations, and health and fitness. Unlike his contemporaries, social issues were never referenced in his lyrics. Wilson acknowledged that he had "never been the type" to preach social messages in his songs.

Recording in the 1960s

Studios and musicians

On the subject of recording, Wilson said, "I was unable to really think as a producer up until the time where I really got familiar with Phil Spector's work. That was when I started to design the experience to be a record rather than just a song." Wilson often attended Spector's recording sessions, taking notes on the producer's arranging and recording methods (later dubbed the "Wall of Sound"), and adopted the same choice of studios and session musicians as Spector. This collective of studio musicians later became known as the Wrecking Crew.

Rather than using Gold Star Studios, Spector's favorite studio, Wilson preferred working at the Studio 3 room of Western for its privacy and for the presence of staff engineer Chuck Britz. From 1962 to 1967, Britz acted as Wilson's "right-hand man". Although more technical recording details such as level mixing and microphone placement were usually handled by Britz, Wilson would adjust the configuration to a large extent. Once Britz assembled a preliminary recording setup, Wilson would take over the console, directing the session musicians from the booth using an intercom or verbal gestures after supplying them with chord charts. According to Britz, "Brian would work with [the players] until he got the sound he wanted. The process often took hours."

Wilson first used the Wrecking Crew for his productions with the Honeys in March 1963. Two months later, during the sessions for Surfer Girl, he began gradually integrating these musicians on the Beach Boys' records.  Still, the band members almost always performed the instrumentation on their records until 1965. By then, a typical Wilson session would feature about 11 or more musicians. In 1966 and 1967, Wilson almost exclusively relied on the Wrecking Crew for the recording of the Beach Boys' backing tracks. After 1967, his use of these musicians was considerably reduced.

Wilson's musicians, many of whom had studied in conservatories, were astounded by his abilities. Among them, guitarist Jerry Cole said, "we would walk out of Brian's sessions shaking our heads, saying, 'This son of a bitch is either crazy, or he's an absolute genius.' And the latter came to pass." Keyboardist Don Randi admired Wilson's chord choices and referred to him as "the Bill Evans of rock 'n' roll". Bassist Carol Kaye remembered, "We had to create [instrumental] parts for all the other groups we cut for, but not Brian. We were in awe of Brian." Drummer Hal Blaine, who was similarly amazed by Wilson's talents, slightly differed in his account of the players' contributions: "Everyone helped arrange, as far as I'm concerned." For his part, Wilson said that he would work out "about a third" of the finished arrangement of a song as he was writing it, leaving the rest to studio experimentation.

Production style
Wilson's best-known productions typically employed instruments such as saxophones and bass harmonicas. He usually instructed Blaine to play only the snare and floor-tom afterbeats used on Spector's records. Owing further to Spector's influence, Wilson rarely used ride or crash cymbals in his work and often combined color tones (such as a banjo doubled with a harpsichord) to produce novel sounds. Among other practices that Wilson copied directly from Spector was recording two echo chambers simultaneously, as well as having standup bass and Fender bass play identical parts. His bass parts were usually played with a hard plectrum, giving the instrument a more percussive sound, a practice he had drawn from Motown.

String ensembles were rarely used in Wilson's productions prior to Pet Sounds, and he did not usually record strings as part of the basic track, instead preferring to overdub them afterward. Once the instrumental track was completed, vocals would then be overdubbed. Beginning with the 1963 song "Surfin' U.S.A.", Wilson double-tracked the vocals, resulting in a deeper and more resonant sound. According to Wilson, after his first nervous breakdown in 1964, he endeavored to "take the things I learned from Phil Spector and use more instruments whenever I could."

Starting in 1964, Wilson performed tape splices on his recordings, usually to allow difficult vocal sections to be performed by the group. By 1965, he had become more adventurous in his use of tape splicing, such as on the song "And Your Dream Comes True", which was recorded in sections and then edited together to create the final song. These experiments culminated with the similar, but more complex editing processes adopted for "Good Vibrations" and Smile. Mark Linett, who has engineered Wilson's recordings since the 1980s, stated, "He certainly wasn't the first person to do edits, but it was unusual to record a song in four or five sections, and then cut it together."

In Priore's assessment, Wilson reconfigured Spector's Wall of Sound techniques in the pursuit of "audio clarity" and "a more lush, comfortable feel". The 2003 book Temples of Sound states that Wilson distinguished himself from Spector through the usage of certain instruments, such as banjo, and that Spector's productions "do not possess the clean muscle of Brian's work."  Danny Hutton, who attended many of Wilson's recording sessions, felt that Wilson's engineering talents had been underrated by the public. Hutton noted, "Somebody could go in right after Brian's session and try to record, and they could never get the sound he got. There was a lot of subtle stuff he did. [...] He was just hands-on. He would change the reverb and the echo, and all of a sudden, something just – whoa! – got twice as big and fat."

Personal life

Deafness in right ear
At age 11, during a Christmas choir recital, Wilson was discovered to have significantly diminished hearing in his right ear. A family doctor soon diagnosed the issue as a nerve impingement. The cause is unclear; theories range from it being a birth defect to him being struck by either his father or a neighborhood boy.

It is unlikely for Wilson to have been born partially deaf since such congenital defects usually appear at an earlier age. Brian's father Murry offered, "He was injured in some football game or some injury of some kind. Or it just happened, who knows?" According to Brian's mother Audree, "Brian thinks it happened when he was around ten. Some kid down the street really whacked him in the ear." On another occasion, Audree said that the deafness was caused by Murry hitting Brian with an iron while Brian was asleep.

One account from Wilson suggested that the deafness was caused by his father slapping his ear shortly before his third birthday. Timothy White states that Brian rarely discussed the issue with Murry after the father had "reacted so menacingly the one time Brian had brought up the subject". Brian said of his father in a 2000 interview, "I was born deaf [...] He hit me with a 2×4, but I was already deaf by that time." In his 2016 memoir, the blame is given to a neighborhood boy.

Due to this infirmity, Wilson developed a habit of speaking from the side of his mouth, giving the false impression that he had had a stroke. He also had ringing in the ear that worsens when he is tired or subjected to loud noise. In the late 1960s, he underwent corrective surgery that was unsuccessful in restoring his hearing.

Relationships and children

Wilson's first serious relationship was with Judy Bowles, a girl he had met at a baseball game in mid-1961. She inspired his songs "Judy" (1962), "Surfer Girl" (1963), and "The Warmth of the Sun" (1964). During their relationship, Wilson gradually became more romantically involved with Marilyn Rovell, a 14-year-old high school student he had met in August 1962. Wilson's "All Summer Long" (1964) nodded to their first meeting with the lyric "Remember when you spilled Coke all over your blouse?" Inspired by a remark from her older sister Diane Rovell, Wilson later wrote "Don't Hurt My Little Sister" (1965) about the affair. Wilson and Bowles were engaged during Christmas 1963 and planned to be married the next December, but ultimately had separated by then.

Wilson and Marilyn were married in December 1964. Together, they had two daughters, Carnie and Wendy (born 1968 and 1969, respectively), who later had musical success of their own as two-thirds of the group Wilson Phillips. Wilson believed that he "wasn't a good husband", nor "much of a father". Marilyn said that her husband completely "backed out" of the responsibility of raising their children because he felt that he was an unfit parent and would repeat the same mistakes of his own father. Biographer Peter Ames Carlin referred to a "disturbing anecdote" printed in a 1971 Rolling Stone article in which Brian discussed his child's sexual experiments. Brian had remarked, "It just goes to prove that if you don't hide anything from kids, they'll start doing things they normally wouldn't do until much later."

Much of the lyrical content from Pet Sounds reflected the couple's early marital struggles. A few years into his marriage to Marilyn, Wilson encouraged her to have affairs with other men, including songwriter Tandyn Almer. In turn, Wilson had simultaneous affairs with Diane and a teenage telephone operator named Debbie Keil. To Marilyn's chagrin, Wilson permitted Keil's frequent visitations to the Wilson household. Wilson wrote "The Night Was So Young" (1977) about Keil and her nightly visits and "My Diane" (1978) about his affair with his sister-in-law.

Initially, Debbie Keil had been a Beach Boys fan who, according to biographer Steven Gaines, had moved from Kansas to Los Angeles with the purpose of getting close to Wilson. From 1969 to 1970, she worked for the band as a fan mail sorter. Keil ultimately contributed many of the anonymous insider quotes that were published in David Leaf's 1978 biography The Beach Boys and the California Myth. Writing in the book's 2022 revision, Leaf explained, "Debbie never tried to shape the narrative. I felt her observations were insightful, very different from what I'd been reading."

Singer Linda Ronstadt's 2013 memoir Simple Dreams implies that she briefly dated Wilson in the 1970s.

In July 1978, Wilson and Marilyn separated, with Wilson filing for divorce in January 1979. Marilyn was given custody of their children. He subsequently maintained a relationship with Keil until 1981. Keil later told Leaf, "I always felt that to survive as 'the girlfriend,' I would ultimately have to be [a father figure] for him every so often. He seemed to always be looking for something to rebel against and withhold from. I didn't have it in me."  Following this, Wilson entered a relationship with one of his nurses, a black woman named Carolyn Williams he had met in 1979, which lasted until January 1983. His 2016 memoir says of Williams, "My head wasn't on straight at all and I would sometimes say stupid things to her. Once I got impatient and said, 'Get your black ass in there and make me lunch.' I apologized immediately but I didn't feel right about it. She split pretty soon and it was mostly because of me. I'm sorry about it even today."

Wilson initially dated former model and car saleswoman Melinda Kae Ledbetter from 1986 to late 1989. Ledbetter stated that the relationship ended prematurely due to interference from Landy. After Wilson parted ways with his psychiatrist, in 1991, he and Ledbetter reconnected and were married on February 6, 1995. Since 1999, Ledbetter has been Wilson's manager, a job which she has said is "basically negotiating, and that's what I did every single day when I sold cars." They adopted five children: Daria Rose (born 1996), Delanie Rae (born 1998), Dylan (born 2004), Dash (born 2009) and Dakota Rose (born 2010). By 2012, Wilson had six grandchildren, two daughters of Carnie and four sons of Wendy.

Beliefs
Wilson grew up in a Presbyterian family. Later in various interviews, he frequently emphasized the spiritual qualities of his music, particularly with respect to Pet Sounds. Wilson also had a fascination with matters such as astrology, numerology and the occult that was reflected in his original conceptions for Smile. In 1966, he stated that he believed all music "starts with religion" and that although he believed in "some higher being who is better than we are", he was not religious in a "formal" sense. Asked whether his music was religiously influenced in 1988, he referred to the 1962 book A Toehold on Zen, and said that he believed that he possessed what is called a "toehold". He explained, "say somebody had a grasp on life, a good grasp—they ought to be able to transfer that over to another thing." In 1990, Wilson said that his LSD flirtations in the mid-1960s led to him developing "a Jesus Christ complex, which was weird", although he added, "to live is to be a Christ, to be alive."

During the late 1960s, Wilson joined his bandmates in the promotion of Transcendental Meditation (TM). In a 1968 interview, he stated that religion and meditation were the same, and felt relieved that all of society had attained "a personal path to God", something that he believed had not happened since "I don't know how many millions of years, or thousands or hundreds [of years ago]". He recalled that he had "already been initiated" into TM beforehand, but "for some ridiculous reason I hadn't followed through with it, and when you don't follow through with something you can get all clogged up." Wilson soon lost interest in TM, saying that "it just doesn't do shit for me. I've given up on it." He revealed to the public that his mantra was "eye-neh-mah" during a 1976 television appearance, moments after declaring that the Maharishi Mahesh Yogi had bestowed him the mantra and had asked him to keep it private.

Wilson described himself in 1976 as someone who had "read too many books" and "went through a thing of having too many paths to choose from and of wanting to do everything and not being able to do it all." He maintained that he still believed, as he did in the 1960s, that the coming of "the great Messiah [...] came in the form of drugs", even though his own drug experiences "really didn't work out so well, so positively." According to friend Stanley Shapiro, he and Dennis once discovered a tape reel labelled "Song to God" and attempted to play it in Brian's home. Brian immediately rushed in the room, confiscated the tape, and shouted "Don't you ever touch that again! That's between me and God!" The tape has since been lost. In a 1977 interview, Wilson promoted "sexual deprivation" as a means of becoming "cosmically conscious". In another interview, from 1995, he revealed that abstinence was the "secret" to how he functions, calling it an "Einsteinian formula" that "create[s] a void in your brain".

In 1999, when asked for his religious beliefs, Wilson responded: "I believe in Phil Spector." Asked again, in 2011, he said that while he had spiritual beliefs, he did not follow any particular religion. Asked in 2004 for his favorite book, Wilson answered "the Bible", and questioned if he believed in life after death, Wilson replied "I don't."

Wilson wrote "The Warmth of the Sun" as a tribute to John F. Kennedy following his assassination in 1963. Asked if he still drew inspiration from modern politics in 2011, Wilson responded, "Politics goes in one ear and out the other. I don't even know the president's name for sure. [laughs] That's how stupid I am." He voted for Republican candidate John McCain during the 2008 U.S. presidential elections.

Mental health

Wilson is diagnosed with schizoaffective disorder and mild manic depression. He regularly experiences auditory hallucinations that present in the form of disembodied voices. According to Wilson, he began having hallucinations at the age of 22 in 1965, shortly after starting to use psychedelic drugs, but the age of 21 has also been reported. Part of his paranoid delusions involved the belief that these voices were Satan coming "in the form of other people that were competing with me and had ideas of killing me." The messages from these imagined characters are mostly derogatory and sometimes positive. Wilson, aware of the fact that they are fantasies, referred to the voices as "heroes and villains" that had forced him into "a life of scare". Asked in 2015 if these hallucinations had inspired songs, Wilson responded, "every now and then".

According to Gaines in his 1986 biography of the Beach Boys, Wilson's family and friends had often struggled "to tell how much of his behavior was out of true craziness and how much was Brian's clever faking". Wilson's 1991 memoir suggests that his Houston flight incident from December 1964 made him conscious of the fact that he "could manipulate people to get my way" through displays of "craziness". After the incident, Marilyn brought Wilson to his first visit to a psychiatrist, who ruled that Wilson's condition was simply a byproduct of work fatigue. Wilson typically refused counseling, and it had been long thought by his family that, rather than mental illness, his idiosyncrasies stemmed from his drug habits, or were merely natural to his personality.

Marilyn said that while Brian had displayed instances of odd behavior, she began having serious concerns about his mental well-being after the birth of their first child in 1968. Later that year, Brian was admitted to a psychiatric hospital, where he was prescribed thorazine for severe anxiety disorder. Carlin speculated that Wilson may have self-admitted and may have been administered treatments ranging from talking therapies to doses of lithium and electroconvulsive therapy during this stay. Responding to accusations of neglect, Marilyn stated that she had sought professional help for her husband for many years. "Brian's ability to 'put on' these professionals made it difficult to find someone who could deal with him on his own level. I am tired of hearing that Brian's problems were never addressed, for those who say that were not there, and do not know the truth!"

Following his admission to Landy's program, Wilson was diagnosed with paranoid schizophrenia, with doctors finding evidence of brain damage caused by excessive and sustained drug use. The paranoid schizophrenia diagnosis was later retracted.  Under Landy's regimen, Wilson developed facial tics, called tardive dyskinesia, that were symptomatic of the excessive psychotropic medications he was taking. Therapist Peter Reum, a fan who had met Wilson on several occasions, stated that Wilson would have deteroriated into a "drooling, palsied mental patient" and died of heart failure had he continued this drug regimen. However, Wilson intimated in a 2002 interview, "I don't regret [the Landy program]. I loved the guy—he saved me." After Wilson sought medical care elsewhere, he was declared to have organic personality disorder. Musician Sean O'Hagan, who was invited to collaborate with Wilson in the 1990s, characterized Wilson as "totally dependent on other people" and had "a kinda weird adult autism."

Wilson's mental condition improved in later years, although his auditory hallucinations were not eliminated, as the voices become more pronounced when he would perform onstage. He credits his relationship with his second wife for allowing him to resume his career as a musician. In his own words, he said that he should have spent the early 2000s "in a mental institution under heavy sedation" due to the stresses of his condition, however, "Things have started to get a little bit easier, but I'm not always in a positive, happy place." In 2002, he said that he felt that his successful treatment inhibited his creativity and songwriting.

In 2019, Wilson postponed some concert dates due to worsening mental health. His social media stated, "I've been struggling with stuff in my head and saying things I don't mean and I don't know why. Its  something I've never dealt with before and we can't quite figure it out just yet." The next month, his social media declared that he had recovered and would resume touring.

Interviews
During his comeback in the late 1970s, Wilson stated that he believed "Interviews are for publicity." At the time, he often solicited drugs from journalists mid-interview. Leaf writes that this was "a game" on Brian's part. "As one friend notes, 'If he had really wanted to get drugs, he would have known where to get them. Nonetheless, journalist Alexis Petridis characterized Wilson's interviews from this period as "heartbreaking and horrifying in equal measure, depicting a halting, visibly terrified man who said he 'felt like a prisoner.

In later years, many writers have accused Wilson of being difficult to interview, as his responses are usually curt or lacking in substance. Edgers wrote in 2000 that "no writer will ever understand Brian Wilson", as Wilson often gives "clipped and conflicting answers to questions both pointed and banal" and "generally makes it clear to interviewers that he would rather be somewhere else -- and that's when he's feeling good." According to Salon writer Peter Gilstrap in 2015: "He's also been known to get up, extend a hand and blurt out 'Thanks!' well before the allotted time is up. And sometimes he just gets tired and shuts down. None of this, however, is due to a bad attitude."

During one 2007 interview, Wilson was asked about "good movies" he had watched recently and answered with Norbit. Then, asked for his favorite movie ever, Wilson again answered Norbit. Writing in a Spin piece marking the tenth anniversary of the exchange, journalist Winston Cook-Wilson (no relation) referred to it as a typical example of Brian's terseness, and jokingly as "one of the most important blog posts in recent American history".

Wilson has admitted to having a poor memory and occasionally lying in interviews to "test" people. David Oppenheim, who interviewed Wilson in 1966, remembered that "we tried to talk with him but didn't get much out of him. Some guy said 'He's not verbal. Journalist Verlyn Klinkenborg, who interviewed Wilson in 1988, observed that although Wilson has a reputation for "blurting out the truth no matter how unflattering it may be", in reality, "the truth he pours out, it seems, is what's true for him at that moment, and if you ask him the same question the next day he may give you another truthful answer that's 180 degrees removed." In 2017, The Charlotte Observers Theoden Janes surmised that, while his past struggles with mental illness are widely documented, Wilson was still "faring well enough" to author his second memoir, as well as to embark on a "hugely ambitious concert tour", so presumably, "is capable of telling people who work for him that he's not up for interviews, if he isn't."

Cultural impact and influence

Sales achievements

From 1962 to 1979, Wilson wrote or co-wrote more than two dozen U.S. Top 40 hits for the Beach Boys. Eleven of those reached the top 10, including the number-ones "I Get Around" (1964), "Help Me, Rhonda" (1965), and "Good Vibrations" (1966). Three more that he produced, but did not write, were the band's "Barbara Ann" (number 2) in 1965, "Sloop John B" (number 3) in 1966, and "Rock and Roll Music" (number 5) in 1976. Among his other top 10 hits, Wilson co-wrote Jan and Dean's "Surf City" (the first chart-topping surf song) and "Dead Man's Curve" (number 8) in 1963, and the Hondells' "Little Honda" (number 9) in 1964.

Popular music and record production

Wilson is widely regarded as one of the most innovative and significant songwriters of the late 20th century, Writing on the topic of his harmonic ingenuity, musicologist Philip Lambert states that Wilson's "harmonic language [...] represents a mastery and expansion of the British-American pop idiom of the 1960s" and that his "range of harmonic imagination represents a distinguished contribution to music in the second half of the twentieth century and beyond, balancing the achievements of his artistic forebears".

The level of creative control that Wilson asserted over his own record output was unprecedented in the music industry, leading him to become the first pop artist credited for writing, arranging, producing, and performing his own material. Although there had been numerous examples of artists who were essentially "self-produced", Wilson distinguished himself for having directed every phase of an album's production. Biographer James Murphy writes,

In addition to being one of the first music producer auteurs, Wilson helped popularize the idea of the recording studio as a compositional tool, and he was the first rock producer to use the studio in this fashion. Granata writes that Wilson's "authoritative approach [...] affected his contemporaries" and thus "redefined" the role of the producer. In his 2015 book Electric Shock, Peter Doggett identifies Wilson as "the most emblematic artist" of an era when "[s]ome of the most notorious pop battles [were] conducted between idealistic musicians and the businessmen who had to finance their increasingly crazy ideas." Brian's brother Carl commented, "Record companies were used to having absolute control over their artists. [...] But what could they say? Brian made good records."

Beatles producer George Martin said, "No one made a greater impact on the Beatles than Brian [...] the musician who challenged them most of all." Jimmy Webb explained, "As far as a major, modern producer who was working right in the middle of the pop milieu, no one was doing what Brian was doing. We didn't even know that it was possible until he did it." David Crosby of the Byrds remarked of Wilson, "He was the most highly regarded pop musician in America. Hands down. Everybody by that time had figured out who was writing it all and who was arranging it all."

His accomplishments as a producer effectively set a precedent that allowed subsequent bands and artists to enter a recording studio and act as producers, either autonomously, or in conjunction with other like minds, and music producers afterward drew on his influence. Following his exercise of total creative autonomy, Wilson ignited an explosion of like-minded California producers, supplanting New York as the center of popular records. Then, Wilson pioneered "project" recording, where an artist records by himself instead of going into an established studio.

The 1967 CBS documentary Inside Pop: The Rock Revolution, hosted by the classical conductor Leonard Bernstein, described Wilson as "one of today's most important pop musicians."  In Virgil Moorefield's 2010 book The Producer as Composer: Shaping the Sounds of Popular Music, Wilson is acknowledged as a "brilliant producer" and "a major innovator in the field of music production." Many other musicians have voiced admiration for Wilson or cited him as an influence, including Bob Dylan, Neil Young, Ray Davies, John Cale, David Byrne, Todd Rundgren, Patti Smith, Mick Jagger, Keith Richards,  Eric Clapton, Bruce Springsteen, Randy Newman, Ray Charles, and Chrissie Hynde.

Art pop, pop art, psychedelia, and progressive music

Further to his invention of new musical textures and his novel applications of quasi-symphonic orchestras, Wilson helped propel the mid-1960s art pop movement, and, with Pet Sounds, was immediately heralded as art rock's leading figure. Carlin writes that Wilson originated "a new kind of art-rock that would combine the transcendent possibilities of art with the mainstream accessibility of pop music". According to journalist Erik Davis, "Not only did [he] write a soundtrack to the early '60s, but Brian let loose a delicate and joyful art pop unique in music history and presaged the mellowness so fundamental to '70s California pop."

Academic Larry Starr writes, "In a sense, Brian Wilson was the first self-conscious second-generation rock 'n' roller" as well as "the first fully realized" example of both an innovative and majorly successful pop musician. Starr credits Wilson with establishing a successful career model that was then followed by the Beatles and other mid-1960s British Invasion acts:
 "Start out by demonstrating a mastery of the basic early rock 'n' roll ballad and uptempo styles"
 "Create original material based on, and extending, those styles"
 "Eventually branch out totally beyond the traditional forms, sounds, and lyric content of rock 'n' roll to create something truly different and unique"

Velvet Underground co-founder Lou Reed, who was mentored by Andy Warhol, wrote in 1966, "There is no god and Brian Wilson is his son." Van Dyke Parks stated, "Brian Wilson was not imitative, he was inventive; for people who don't write songs, it's hard to understand how inventive he really was." Parks elaborated that "Wilson made music as accessible as a cartoon and yet rewarded repeated listening as much as Bach", and he too suggested that Wilson's sensibilities overlapped with those espoused by other pop artists of the era, including Warhol and Roy Lichtenstein. In his 1969 book Awopbopaloobop Alopbamboom: The Golden Age of Rock, Nik Cohn recognizes Wilson as a creator of "genuine pop art. [...] Simply, he'd taken high school and raised it to completely new levels. He'd turned it into myth."

Under Wilson's creative leadership, the Beach Boys became major contributors to the development of psychedelic music, although they are rarely credited for this distinction. In an editorial piece on sunshine pop, a subgenre closely associated with psychedelia, The A.V. Clubs Noel Murray recognized Wilson as among "studio rats [that] set the pace for how pop music could and should sound in the Flower Power era: at once starry-eyed and wistful." Murray added that Wilson himself rarely produced true sunshine pop music, but was still "hugely influential" to the genre's development.

Wilson's work with the Beach Boys, especially on Pet Sounds, "Good Vibrations" and Smile, marked the beginnings of progressive pop, a genre that is distinguished by sophisticated and unorthodox approaches to pop music. Writing in 1978, David Leaf identified Wilson's 1960s productions as a chief influence on bands such as Queen, Electric Light Orchestra (ELO), 10cc, and Crosby, Stills, Nash & Young, among others. Musicologist Bill Martin, an author of books about progressive rock, acknowledged Wilson's influence on the prog movement, particularly through his complex songwriting and basslines, adding that Wilson, alongside the Who frontman Pete Townshend, "showed that adolescence can be the subject of great music".

Writing in 2016, The Atlantics Jason Guriel credits Pet Sounds with inventing the modern pop album, stating that Wilson "paved the way for auteurs [and] anticipated the rise of the producer [and] the modern pop-centric era, which privileges producer over artist and blurs the line between entertainment and art." Among the later artists situated within Wilson's template are Prince, Michael Jackson, Radiohead, and Kanye West.

Naïve art, rock/pop division, and outsider music

Wilson's popularity and success is partly attributed to the perceived naïveté of his work and personality. David Marks opined that although Wilson's early records could appear "campy and corny [...] [Brian] was dead serious about them all and that's what made them work [...] It's hard to believe that anyone could be that naive and honest, but he was. That's what made those records so successful. You could feel the sincerity in them." In music journalist Barney Hoskyns' description, the "particular appeal of Wilson's genius" can be traced to his "singular naivety" and "ingenuousness", alongside the fact that his band was "the very obverse of hip". John Cale argued, "What Brian came to mean was an ideal of naïveté and innocence [...] Pet Sounds was adult and childlike at the same time."

The most culturally significant "tragedy" in 1960s rock, according to journalist Richard Goldstein, was Wilson's failure to overcome his insecurities and realize "his full potential as a composer" after having anticipated developments such as electronica and minimalism. Writing in 1981, sociomusicologist Simon Frith identified Wilson's withdrawal in 1967, along with Phil Spector's self-imposed retirement in 1966, as the catalysts for the "rock/pop split that has afflicted American music ever since". Frith added that, while the influence of both these producers was evident in 1967 hit songs by the Electric Prunes, the Turtles, Strawberry Alarm Clock, Tommy James and the Shondells, and the 5th Dimension, the most enduring and successful American pop act was the Monkees, which had been created as "an obvious imitation of the Beatles".

Speaking in a 1997 interview, musician Sean O'Hagan felt that rock music's domination of mass culture following the mid-1960s had the effect of artistically stifling contemporary pop composers who, until then, had been guided by Wilson's increasingly ambitious creative advancements. In her article which dubbed him "the godfather of sensitive pop", music journalist Patricia Cárdenas credits Wilson with ultimately inspiring many musicians to value the craft of pop songwriting as much as "the primal, hard-driving rock 'n' roll the world had come to know since then."

By the mid-1970s, Wilson had tied with ex-Pink Floyd member Syd Barrett for rock music's foremost "mythical casualty". Timothy White wrote that Wilson's ensuing legend rivaled that of the California myth promoted by the Beach Boys, while Brackett characterized Wilson's "rise and fall and rise" as a "downright Shakespearean" story, with Wilson "elevated to Olympian status by every serious musician since".

Ultimately, Wilson became regarded as the most famous outsider musician. Author Irwin Chusid, who codified the term "outsider music", noted Wilson as a potentially unconvincing example of the genre due to Wilson's commercial successes, but argued that the musician should be considered an outsider due to his "tormented" background, past issues with drug dependencies, and unorthodox songwriting. Other critics have drawn comparisons between Wilson and the outsider musician Daniel Johnston, who also struggled with lifelong mental illness and a "genius" labeling.

Alternative music and continued cultural resonance

Wilson has also been declared the "godfather" of punk, indie rock, and emo. Principally through his early records, Wilson, alongside his collaborator Mike Love, was a key influence on the development of punk rock and the movement's evolution into indie rock. According to critic Carl Wilson (no relation to the Beach Boys' Carl Wilson), "The Ramones, for instance, seized on and subverted the early Wilson template: Be True to Your School became Rock'n'Roll High School." The critic also notes, "For the artier branches of post-punk, Wilson's pained vulnerability, his uses of offbeat instruments and his intricate harmonies, not to mention the Smile saga itself, became a touchstone", especially for such bands as Pere Ubu, XTC, U2, R.E.M., the Pixies, and My Bloody Valentine.

Later in the 20th century, Wilson became known as the "godfather" to an era of independently produced music that was heavily indebted to his melodic sensibilities, chamber pop orchestrations, and recording experiments. Author Nathan Wiseman-Trowse credited Wilson, alongside Spector, with having "arguably pioneered", in popular music, the "approach to the sheer physicality of sound", an integral characteristic of the dream pop genre. Newer acts who were influenced by Wilson, or that voiced their admiration, included Robyn Hitchcock, Redd Kross, the Church, Rain Parade, Big Dipper, the Go-Betweens, Psychic TV, the Feelies, and the dBs.

Many of the most popular acts of the 1980s and 1990s recorded songs that celebrated or referenced Wilson's music, including R.E.M., Bruce Springsteen, Barenaked Ladies, the Jayhawks, and Wilco. Simultaneously, the High Llamas inspired many American touring groups, especially around Los Angeles, to recognize Wilson as an "alternative music hero". Stereolab and the Elephant 6 collective, whose roster included Apples in Stereo, of Montreal and the Olivia Tremor Control, were all heavily influenced by Wilson. In Japan, references to Wilson and his "mad boy genius" legend became a common trope among  musicians such as Cornelius, who was heralded by critics as "the Japanese Brian Wilson". In 2000, Marina Records released Caroline Now!, an album of Wilson's songs recorded by artists including Alex Chilton, Kim Fowley, the Aluminum Group, Eric Matthews, Saint Etienne, Peter Thomas, the High Llamas, and Jad Fair of Half Japanese.

Thanks to acts such as Panda Bear and his 2007 album Person Pitch, Wilson began to be recognized for his continued impact on the indie music vanguard since the late 2000s. In 2009, Pitchfork ran an editorial feature that traced the development of nascent indie music scenes, and chillwave in particular, to the themes of Wilson's songs and his reputation for being an "emotionally fragile dude with mental health problems who coped by taking drugs." Writing in his 2011 book on the Beach Boys, Mark Dillon stated that tributes to Wilson remained "common among musicians young enough to be his children".

Wilson's influence continues to be attributed to modern dream pop acts such as Au Revoir Simone, Wild Nothing, Alvvays, and Lana del Ray. In 2022, She & Him, accompanied by the release of Melt Away: A Tribute to Brian Wilson, embarked on a concert tour dedicated to renditions of Wilson's songs.

In popular culture

Authorized documentary films
 Brian Wilson: I Just Wasn't Made for These Times, directed by Don Was, premiered at the Sundance Film Festival in January 1995. It features new interviews with Wilson and many other musicians, including Linda Ronstadt and Sonic Youth's Thurston Moore, who discuss Wilson's life and his music achievements.
 Beautiful Dreamer: Brian Wilson and the Story of Smile, directed by David Leaf, premiered on the Showtime network in October 2004. It includes interviews with Wilson and dozens of his associates, albeit none of his surviving bandmates from the Beach Boys, who declined to appear in the film.
 Brian Wilson: Long Promised Road, directed by Brent Wilson (no relation), premiered at the Tribeca Film Festival in June 2021. It is focused on the previous two decades of Wilson's life, with appearances from Bruce Springsteen, Elton John, Jim James, Nick Jonas, Taylor Hawkins, Don Was, and Jakob Dylan.

Other works based on Wilson
 John Cale's 1974 album Slow Dazzle included "Mr. Wilson", one of the earliest songs written about Wilson himself.
 The Barenaked Ladies recorded "Brian Wilson" for their 1993 album Gordon. A live version of their song was issued as a single and reached the top 40 charts in 1998. Wilson himself performed the song at concerts and released a cover version on the album Live at the Roxy.
 The 1995 film Grace of My Heart includes a character named Jay Philips, played by Matt Dillon, that is modeled after Wilson. Wilson himself wrote "Gettin' In over My Heard" for the film, but the song was rejected.
 The 2002 album All the Time in the World by power pop band Lazlo Bane features the song "Crooked Smile," which considers the theme of living with depression from Brian [Wilson]'s perspective, chronicling Wilson's long battle with mental health. 
 The 2007 comedy film Walk Hard: The Dewey Cox Story contains scenes inspired by the Smile saga, in which the titular character is consumed with recording his "masterpiece" (titled "Black Sheep") and has a mental breakdown.
 Actor Paul Dano drew on his experience playing Wilson in Love & Mercy as the basis of his performance as the Riddler in the 2022 film The Batman.

Accolades

Awards and honors

 Nine-time Grammy Award nominee, two-time winner.
 2005: Best Rock Instrumental Performance for "Mrs. O'Leary's Cow".
 2013: Best Historical Album for The Smile Sessions.
 1988: Rock and Roll Hall of Fame as a member of the Beach Boys.
 2000: Songwriters Hall of Fame, inducted by Paul McCartney, who referred to him as "one of the great American geniuses".
 2006: UK Music Hall of Fame, inducted by Pink Floyd guitarist David Gilmour.
 2003: Ivor Novello International Award for his contributions to popular music.
 2003: Honorary doctorate of music from Northeastern University in Boston, Massachusetts.
 2004: BMI Icon at the 52nd annual BMI Pop Awards, being saluted for his "unique and indelible influence on generations of music makers."
 2005: MusiCares Person of the Year, for his artistic and philanthropic accomplishments
 2007: Hollywood Bowl Hall of Fame
 2007: Kennedy Center Honors committee recognized Wilson for a lifetime of contributions to American culture through the performing arts in music.
 2008: Golden Plate Award of the American Academy of Achievement.
 2011: UCLA George and Ira Gershwin Award at UCLA Spring Sing.
 2016: Golden Globe nomination for "One Kind of Love" from Love & Mercy.

Polls and critics' rankings
, the website Acclaimed Music lists eight of Wilson's co-written songs within the thousand highest rated songs of all time: "Surfin' U.S.A." from 1963; "Don't Worry Baby" and "I Get Around" from 1964, "California Girls" from 1965; "Wouldn't It Be Nice", "God Only Knows", and "Good Vibrations" from 1966; and "Surf's Up" from 1971.
 In 1966, Wilson was ranked number four in NMEs "World Music Personality" reader's poll—about 1,000 votes ahead of Bob Dylan and 500 behind John Lennon.
 In 2008, Wilson was ranked number 52 in Rolling Stones list of the "100 Greatest Singers of All Time". He was described in his entry as "the ultimate singer's songwriter" of the mid-1960s.
 In 2012, Wilson was ranked number eight in NMEs list of the "50 Greatest Producers Ever", elaborating "few consider quite how groundbreaking Brian Wilson's studio techniques were in the mid-60s".
 In 2015, Wilson was ranked number 12 in Rolling Stones list of the "100 Greatest Songwriters of All Time".
 In 2020, Brian Wilson Presents Smile was ranked number 399 in Rolling Stones list of "The 500 Greatest Albums of All Time".
 In 2022, Wilson was ranked second in Ultimate Classic Rocks list of the best producers in rock history.
 In 2023, Wilson was ranked number 57 in Rolling Stones list of the "200 Greatest Singers of All Time", elaborating that "he is so renowned for his producing and songwriting skills that his gifts as a vocalist are often overlooked".

Discography

 Brian Wilson (1988)
 Sweet Insanity (1990) (unofficial)
 I Just Wasn't Made for These Times (1995) (soundtrack)
 Orange Crate Art (1995) (with Van Dyke Parks)
 Imagination (1998)
 Gettin' In over My Head (2004)
 Brian Wilson Presents Smile (2004)
 What I Really Want for Christmas (2005)
 That Lucky Old Sun (2008)
 Brian Wilson Reimagines Gershwin (2010)
 In the Key of Disney (2011)
 No Pier Pressure (2015)
 At My Piano (2021)
 Brian Wilson: Long Promised Road (2021) (soundtrack)

Filmography

Film

Television

See also
 Pet Projects: The Brian Wilson Productions
 Playback: The Brian Wilson Anthology
 List of people with absolute pitch
 List of people with bipolar disorder
 List of recluses
 List of unreleased songs recorded by the Beach Boys

Notes

References

Bibliography

Further reading
Books
 
 
 
 

Journals
 

Web articles

External links
 
 
 
 
 
 

 
21st-century American keyboardists
1942 births
Living people
Carl Wilson
Dennis Wilson
American male composers
20th-century American composers
American male singers
American organists
American male organists
American pop rock singers
American pop rock musicians
Record producers from California
Surf music record producers
American rock bass guitarists
American male bass guitarists
American rock keyboardists
American rock pianists
American male pianists
American rock songwriters
American people of Dutch descent
American people of English descent
American people of German descent
American people of Irish descent
American people of Swedish descent
American tenors
American baritones
Capitol Records artists
El Camino College alumni
Giant Records (Warner) artists
Grammy Award winners
Guitarists from California
Kennedy Center honorees
Musicians from Hawthorne, California
Musicians from Inglewood, California
Nonesuch Records artists
People with bipolar disorder
People with brain injuries
People with schizoaffective disorder
Sire Records artists
Singer-songwriters from California
The Beach Boys members
Outsider musicians
American male guitarists
Art pop musicians
Artists with disabilities
Avant-pop musicians
20th-century American guitarists
20th-century American pianists
21st-century American pianists
20th-century organists
21st-century organists
20th-century American keyboardists
Deaf musicians